= 1989 Pacific hurricane season =

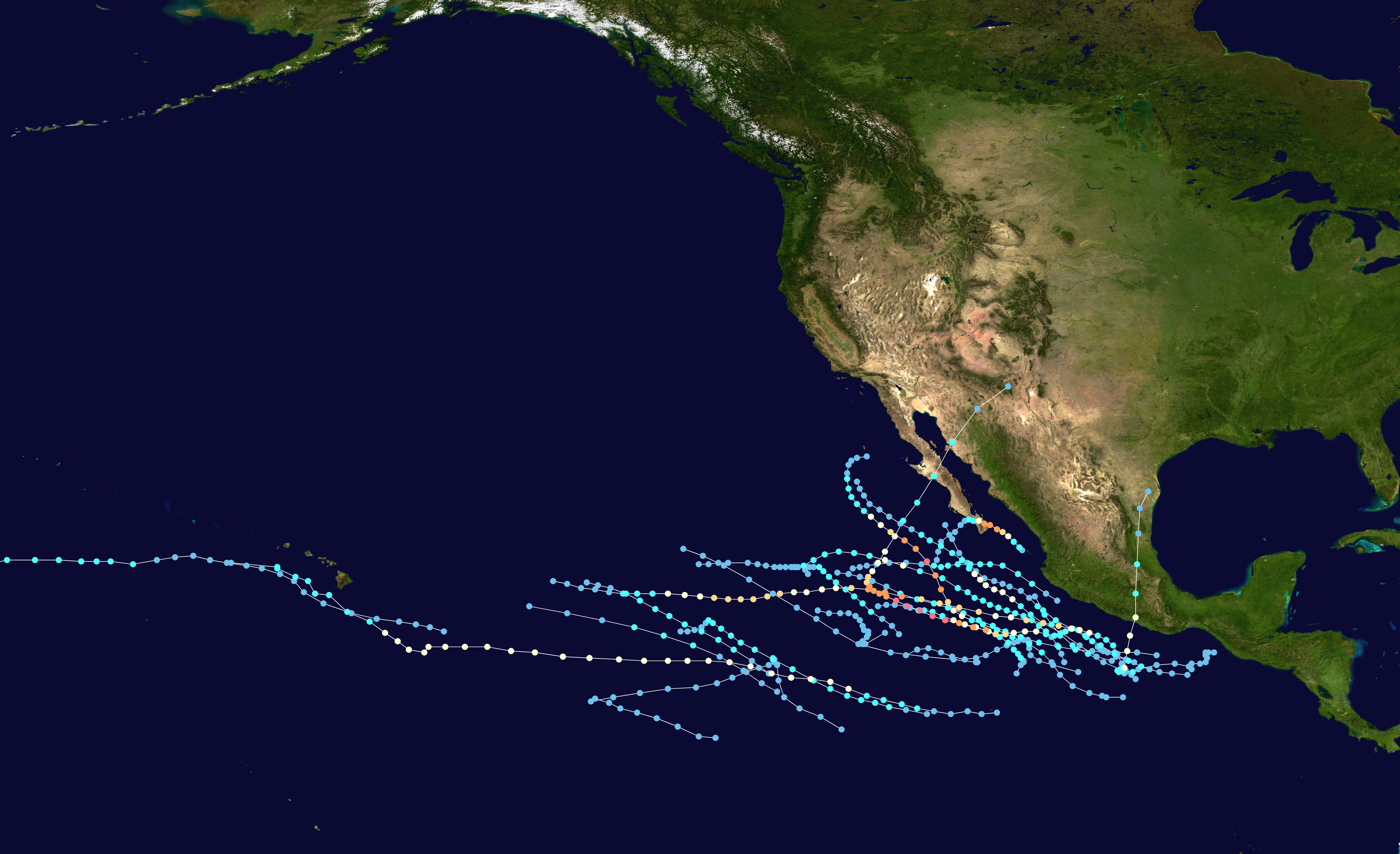
- Season summary map

Seasonal boundaries
- First system formed: January 9, 1989
- Last system dissipated: October 19, 1989

Strongest storm
- Name: Raymond
  - Maximum winds: 145 mph (230 km/h) (1-minute sustained)
  - Lowest pressure: 935 mbar (hPa; 27.61 inHg)

Seasonal statistics
- Total depressions: 25
- Total storms: 18
- Hurricanes: 9
- Major hurricanes (Cat. 3+): 4
- Total fatalities: 34 total
- Total damage: $1.75 million (1989 USD)

Related articles
- Timeline of the 1989 Pacific hurricane season; 1989 Atlantic hurricane season; 1989 Pacific typhoon season; 1989 North Indian Ocean cyclone season

The 1989 Pacific hurricane season was a near normal season. It officially started on May 15, 1989, in the eastern Pacific, and on June 1, 1989, in the central Pacific, and lasted until November 30, 1989. These dates conventionally delimit the period of each year when most tropical cyclones form in the northeastern Pacific Ocean. A total of 18 storms and 9 hurricanes formed, which was near long-term averages. Four hurricanes reached major hurricane status (Category 3 or higher) on the Saffir–Simpson scale.

In June, Hurricane Cosme crossed over Mexico as a Category 1 hurricane and killed 30 people. In August, Hurricane Kiko made landfall on the Gulf of California side of the Baja California Peninsula as a Category 3 major hurricane, however, little damage resulted. In October, Hurricane Raymond peaked as a Category 4 major hurricane, the strongest storm of the season. The storm then weakened significantly before making landfall in the Baja California Peninsula as a tropical storm.

== Seasonal summary ==
Overall, the season continued the general trend in the 1980s of near to above-average seasons in the East Pacific. Seventeen cyclones formed. Eight peaked at tropical storm strength. Nine systems became hurricanes, of which four were major hurricanes at Category 3 intensity or higher on the Saffir–Simpson scale. On August 28, three systems were active, one of a few times when there has been three tropical cyclones active simultaneously (Kiko, Lorena, and Manuel) in the east Pacific (west of 140°W). Despite the activity this season, no named storms formed in October. This was the second consecutive season this happened.

== Systems ==
=== Tropical Storm Winona ===
- Tropical storm (SSHWS)
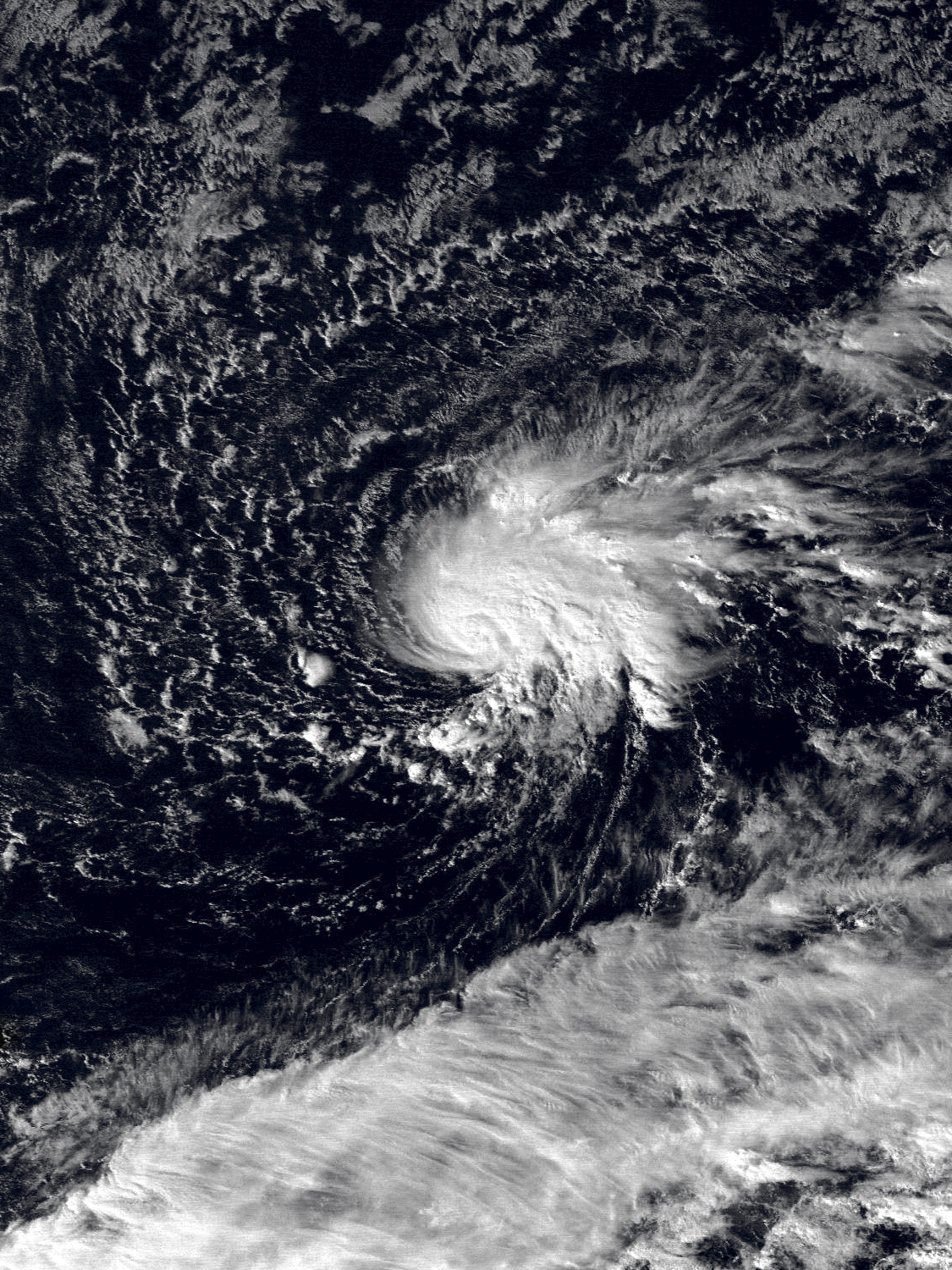
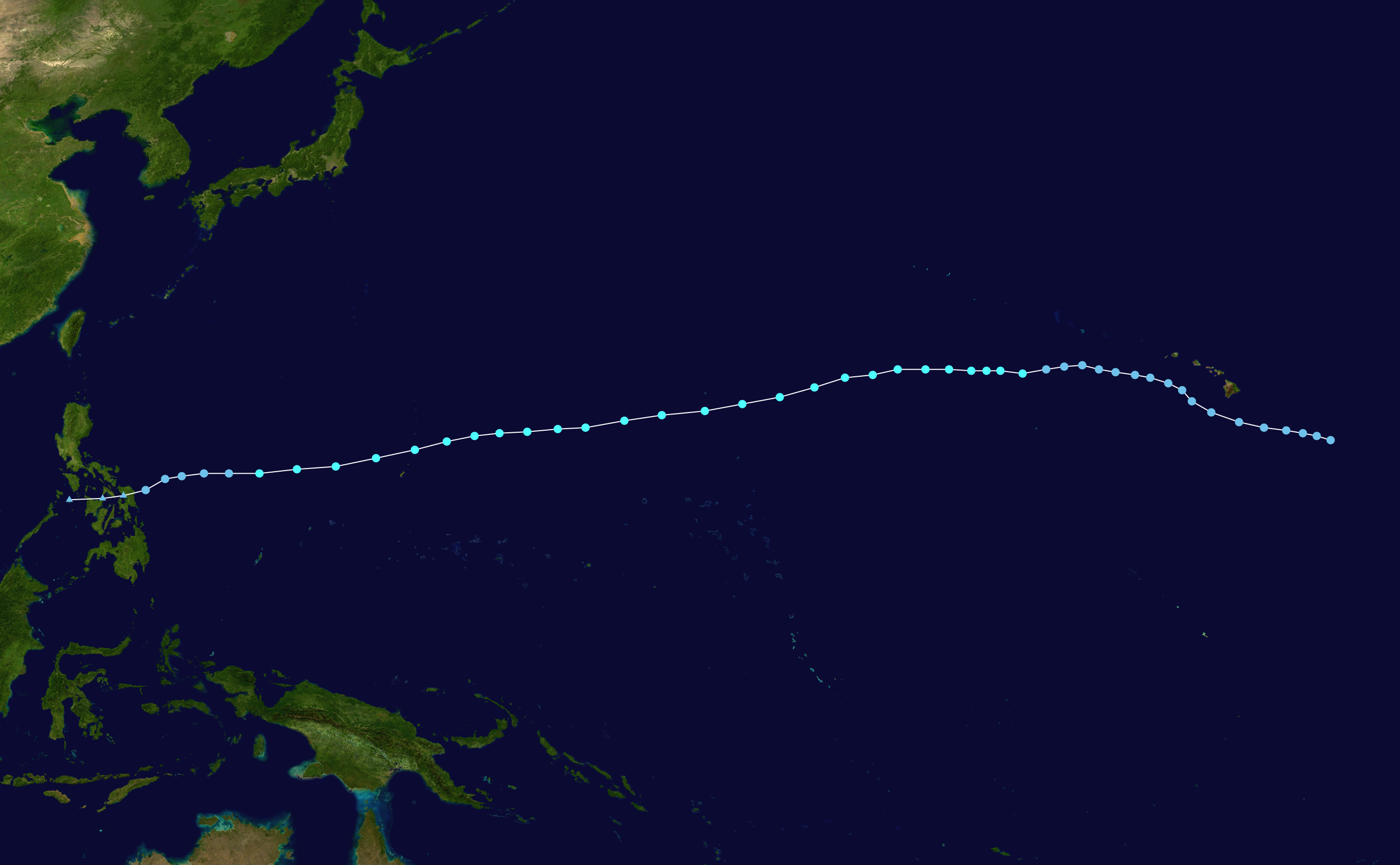
- Duration: January 9 – January 15 (Exited basin)
- Peak intensity: 45 mph (75 km/h) (1-min); 1012 mbar (hPa)

During the second week of January, an upper-level trough located east of Hawaii created an area of divergence to its southeast, allowing an area of low pressure to develop alongside deep convection. Initially, the system was hampered by wind shear as it moved west-northwestward to the south of Hawaii; however, by January 11, the system was able to maintain convection over its center and was classified as a tropical depression. During post-storm analysis it was determined that the system became a tropical storm late on January 13. Its strengthening took place north of 20°N, a very unusual latitude for tropical cyclogenesis to occur in January. Meteorologists at the time struggled to forecast the storm as climatological forecast guidance (modeling based on previous cyclones), was not available due to the uniqueness of the storm. On January 15, the system crossed the International Date Line and entered the Western Pacific basin.

As a tropical depression, the storm brought heavy rains to portions of Hawaii, triggering flash flooding on a few islands. No damage resulted from the floods. After becoming a tropical storm, the system brushed Wake Island, bringing gusty winds and moderate rainfall. Several days later, the storm passed near the Mariana Islands and Guam, bringing tropical storm-force wind gusts and heavy rainfall. Minor damage resulted from Winona but there was no loss of life. Operationally, this system was not classified a tropical storm until January 16, when it was given the name Winona; thus it was not warned upon by the Central Pacific Hurricane Center during its early stages.

=== Tropical Storm Adolph ===
- Tropical storm (SSHWS)
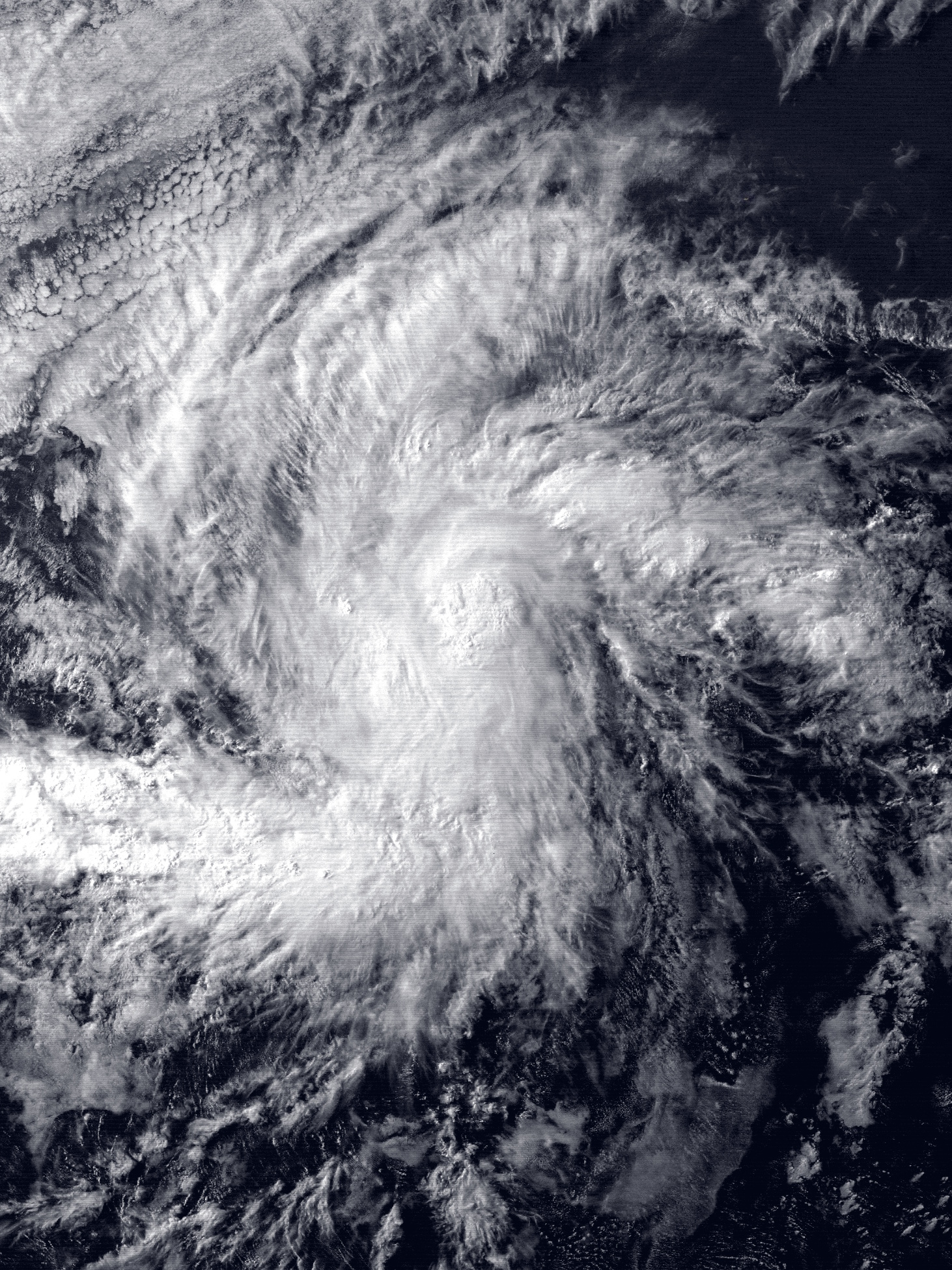
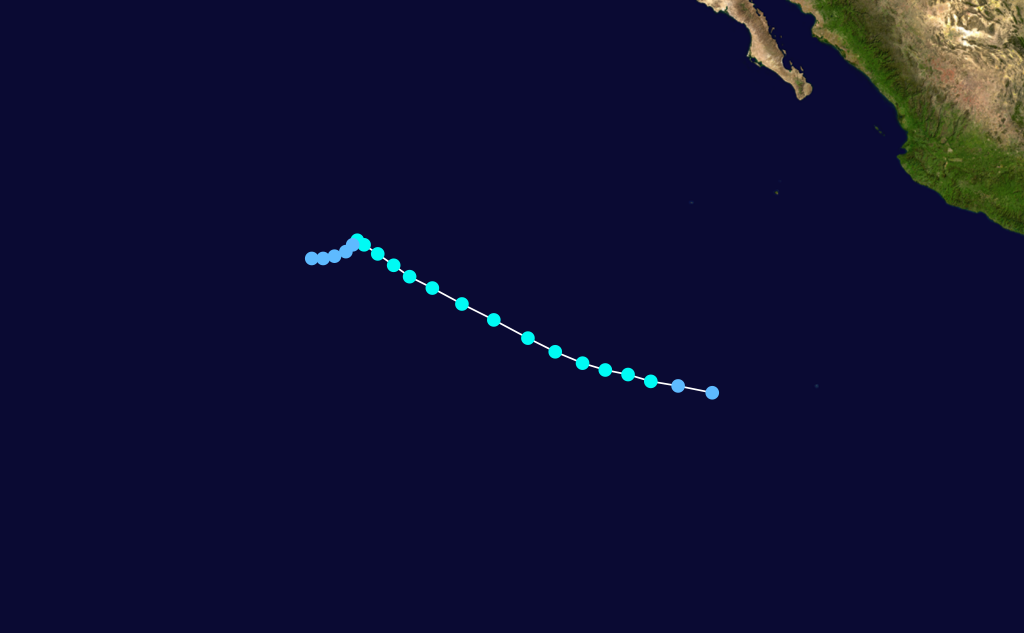
- Duration: May 31 – June 5
- Peak intensity: 65 mph (100 km/h) (1-min); 994 mbar (hPa)

The first storm of the season developed out of a weak area of low pressure situated about 570 mi (925 km) south-southwest of Acapulco, Mexico. Tracking towards the west, the circulation briefly dissipated on May 30, before redeveloping the following day into Tropical Depression One-E. A ridge of high pressure north of the system steered it towards the west-northwest. By 0600 UTC on June 1, the National Hurricane Center (NHC) upgraded the depression to a tropical storm and gave it the name Adolph. Adolph continued to strengthen until early on June 2, at which time it reached its peak intensity with winds of 65 mph (100 km/h) and a minimum pressure of 994 mbar (hPa). Shortly after peaking, cool, dry air became entrained in the circulation, preventing further intensification. Early on June 3, Adolph weakened slightly due to unfavorable conditions. Later that day, Adolph briefly re-intensified. On June 4, strong wind shear displaced convection associated with the storm to the west of the center of circulation; this resulted in Adolph weakening to a tropical depression by 1800 UTC that day, and Adolph persisted until June 5 at which time it dissipated.

=== Hurricane Barbara ===
- Category 1 hurricane (SSHWS)
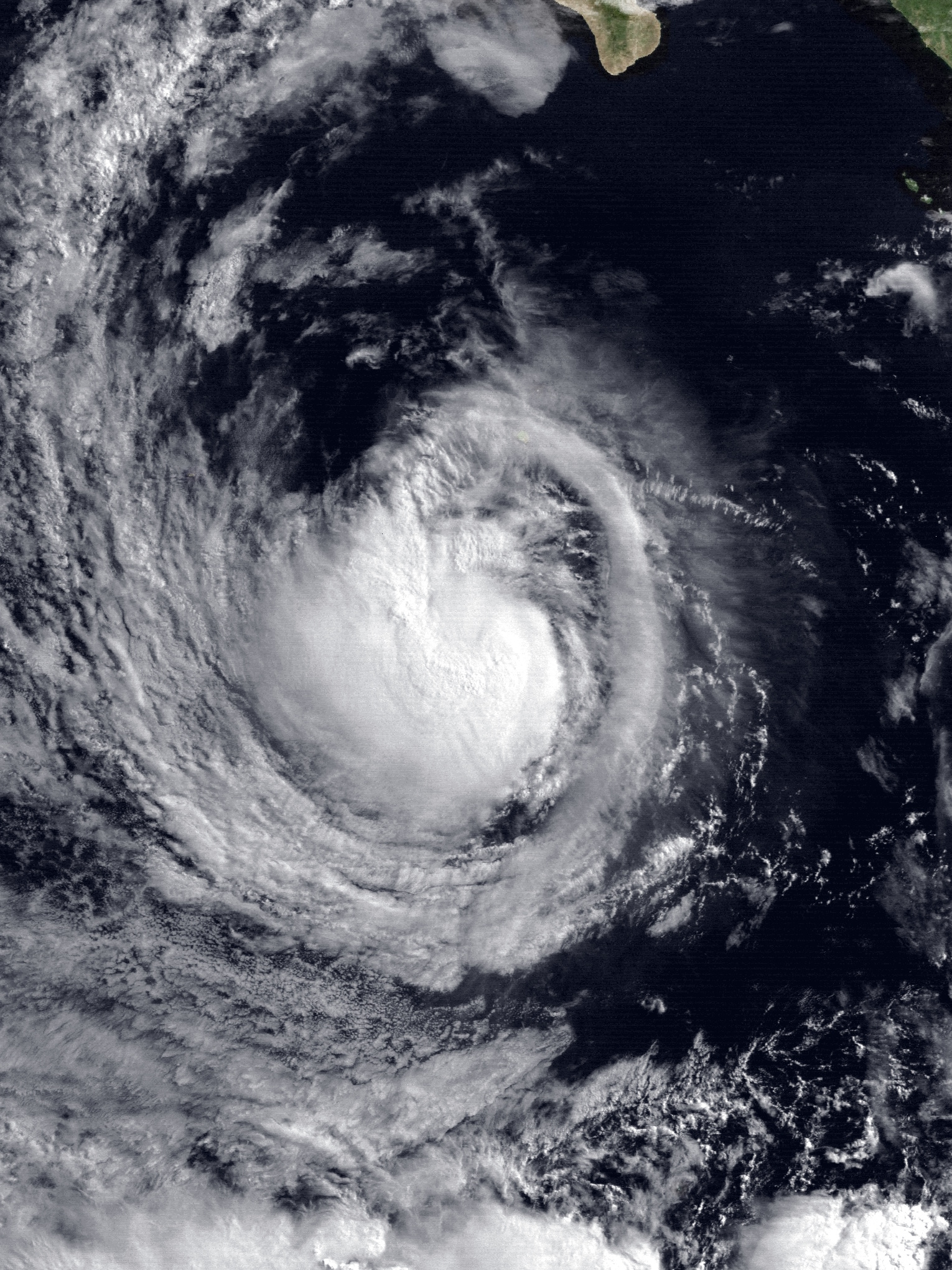
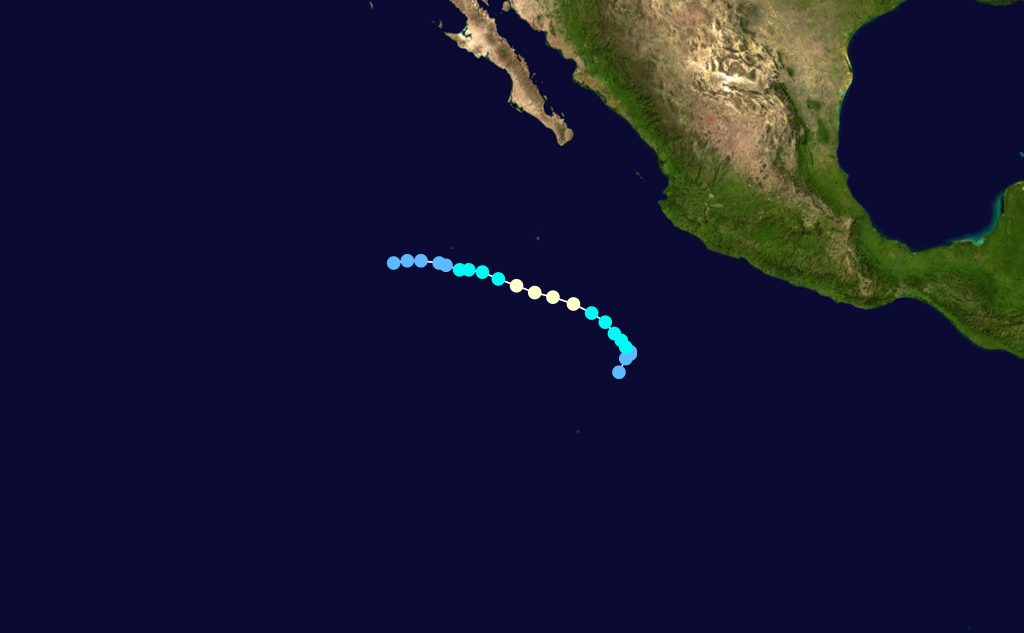
- Duration: June 15 – June 21
- Peak intensity: 80 mph (130 km/h) (1-min); 984 mbar (hPa)

On June 10, an area of disturbed weather was located several hundred miles southwest of Acapulco, Mexico, and the system slowed to a westward drift. After gradually becoming better organized, the NHC estimated that the wave spawned Tropical Depression Two-E around 1800 UTC on June 15. Initially, the depression towards the northwest before a ridge of high pressure situated over Mexico caused the storm to turn towards the west-northwest. Based on improving satellite presentation, the NHC upgraded the depression to Tropical Storm Barbara. With favorable conditions, Barbara continued to intensify, attaining hurricane-status roughly 24 hours after being named. Six hours later, the storm reached its peak intensity with winds of 80 mph (130 km/h). Satellite images early on June 18 showed that cool, dry air was becoming entrained into the northern inflow of the storm and Barbara was nearing cooler waters. These factors led to the storm weakening below hurricane intensity by 0000 UTC on June 19. Wind shear at this time also began to increase, displacing all convection associated with the storm to the northeast of the center. By June 20, the former hurricane was further downgraded to a tropical depression. The NHC issued their final advisory on the system early on June 21; however, the remnants of the storm persisted until June 27.

=== Hurricane Cosme ===
- Category 1 hurricane (SSHWS)
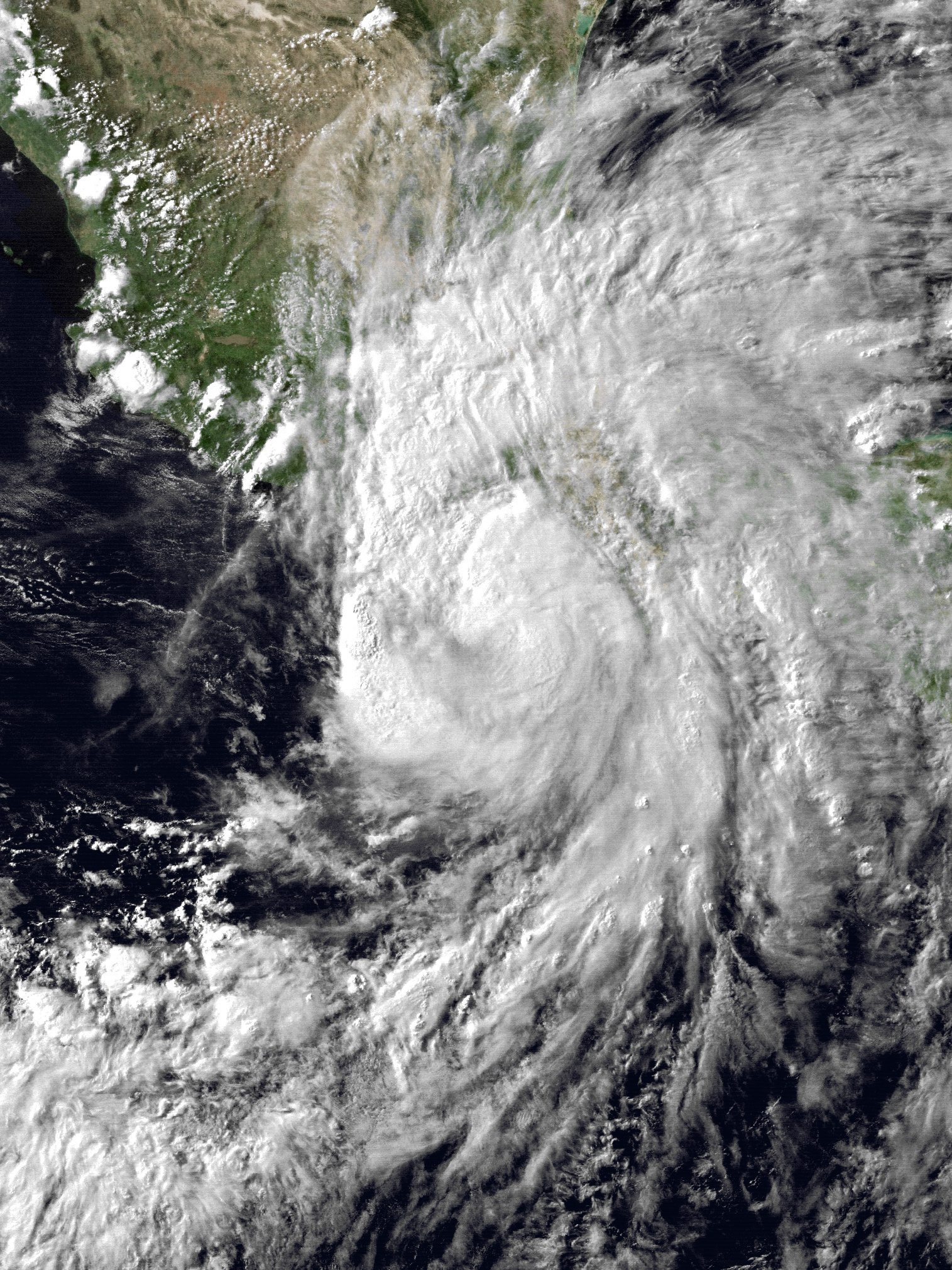
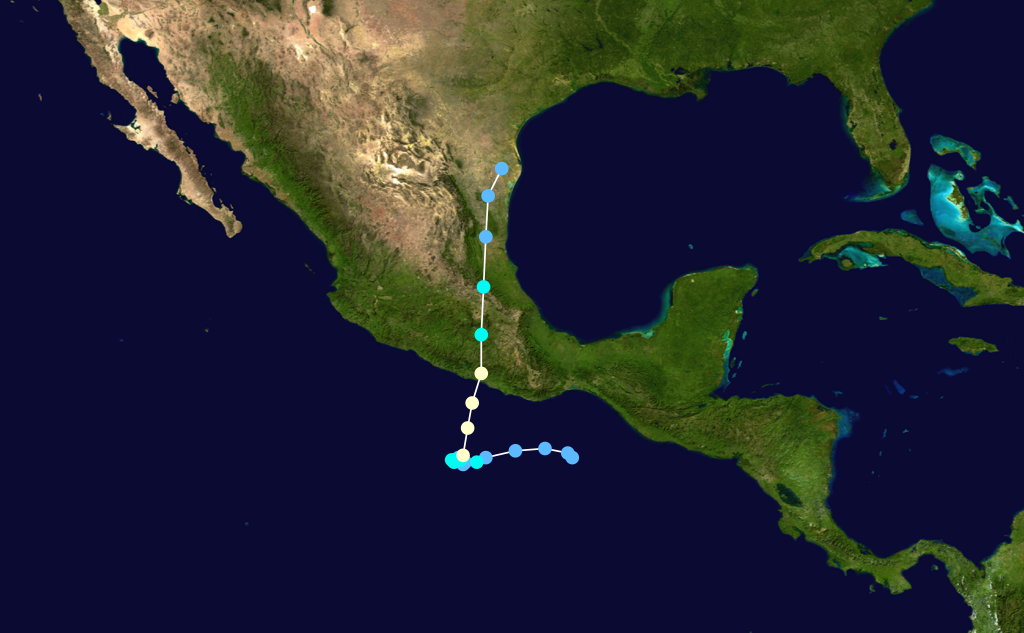
- Duration: June 19 – June 23
- Peak intensity: 85 mph (140 km/h) (1-min); 979 mbar (hPa)

On June 18 a tropical disturbance formed several hundred miles off the coast of Mexico. Ships in the vicinity of the storm, in addition to satellite images, indicated that the disturbance had developed into Tropical Depression Three-E around 1800 UTC. Remaining nearly stationary, the depression gradually strengthened into a tropical storm by June 20, receiving the name Cosme at that time. Early on June 21, Cosme began to track towards the north and intensify. Around 1200 UTC, Cosme strengthened into a Category 1 hurricane on the Saffir–Simpson scale. Several hours later, Cosme reached its peak intensity. Late on June 21, the center of the hurricane made landfall on the Mexican coast, just east of Acapulco with winds of 80 mph (130 km/h). The low associated with the former hurricane was last identified near Brownsville, Texas.

Cosme brought heavy rains, which killed at least 30 people due to drowning. Many adobe homes were destroyed, but a specific cost of damage is not known. The highest rainfall recorded in relation to Cosme was 16.1 in (410 mm) in Yautepec San Bartolo, Mexico.

=== Tropical Depression Four-E ===
- Tropical depression (SSHWS)
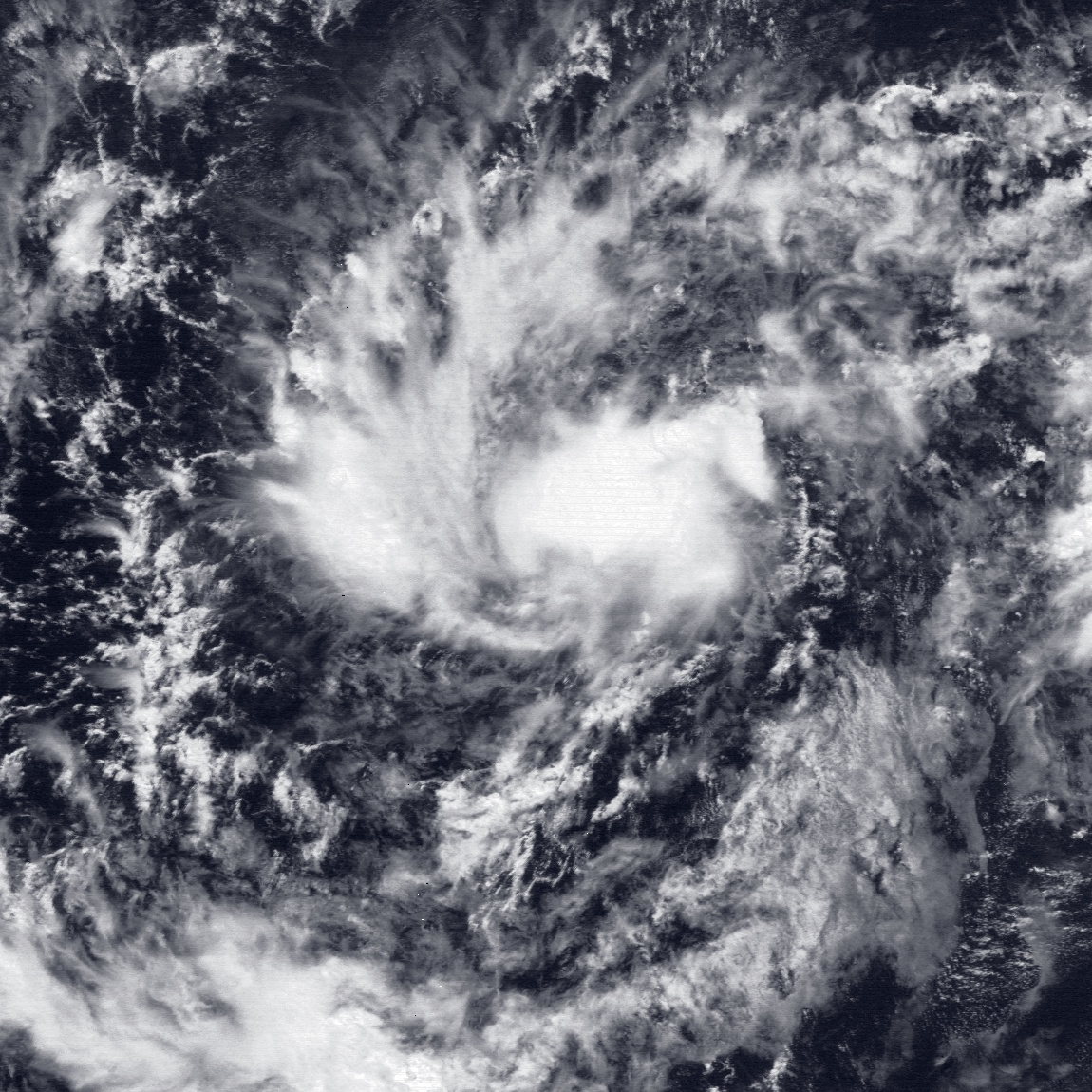
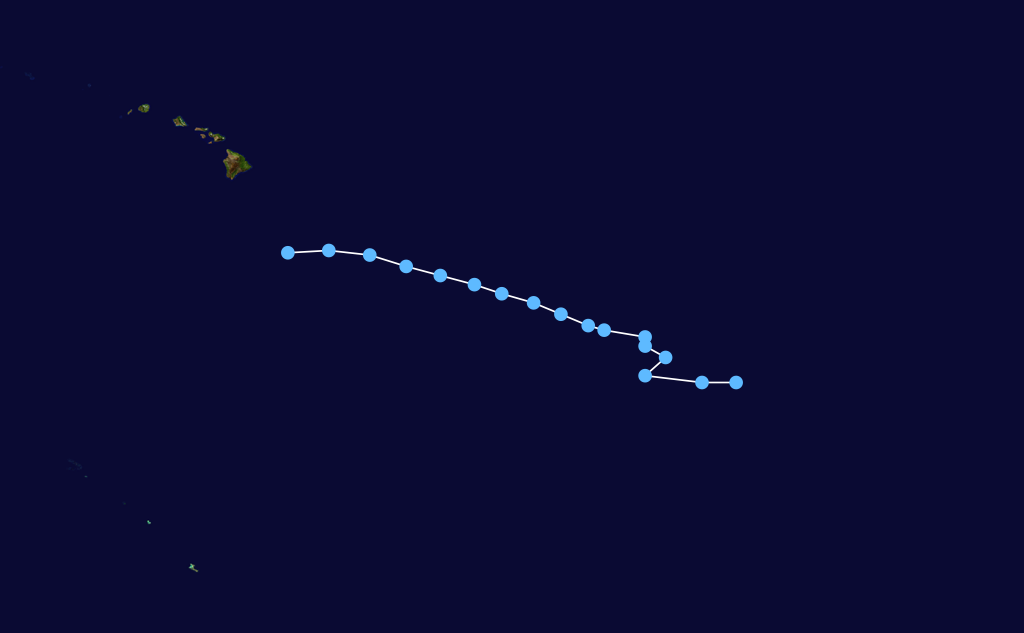
- Duration: July 9 – July 14
- Peak intensity: 35 mph (55 km/h) (1-min);

The fourth tropical cyclone of the season formed as a well-organized depression on July 9. Deep convection associated with the system indicated that intensification into a tropical storm was possible. The system track generally westward in response to high-pressure system to the north. On July 10, the depression quickly became disorganized, with only a small area of convection around the center remaining by midday. Although the depression was nearly at tropical storm intensity, the NHC held off on upgrading it due to its proximity to Tropical Depression Five-E. However, the system failed to intensify. By July 11, the depression entered the Central Pacific hurricane center's area of responsibility. Tracking generally northwest, the system slowly weakened before dissipating on July 14 to the south of Hawaii.

=== Tropical Depression Five-E ===
- Tropical depression (SSHWS)
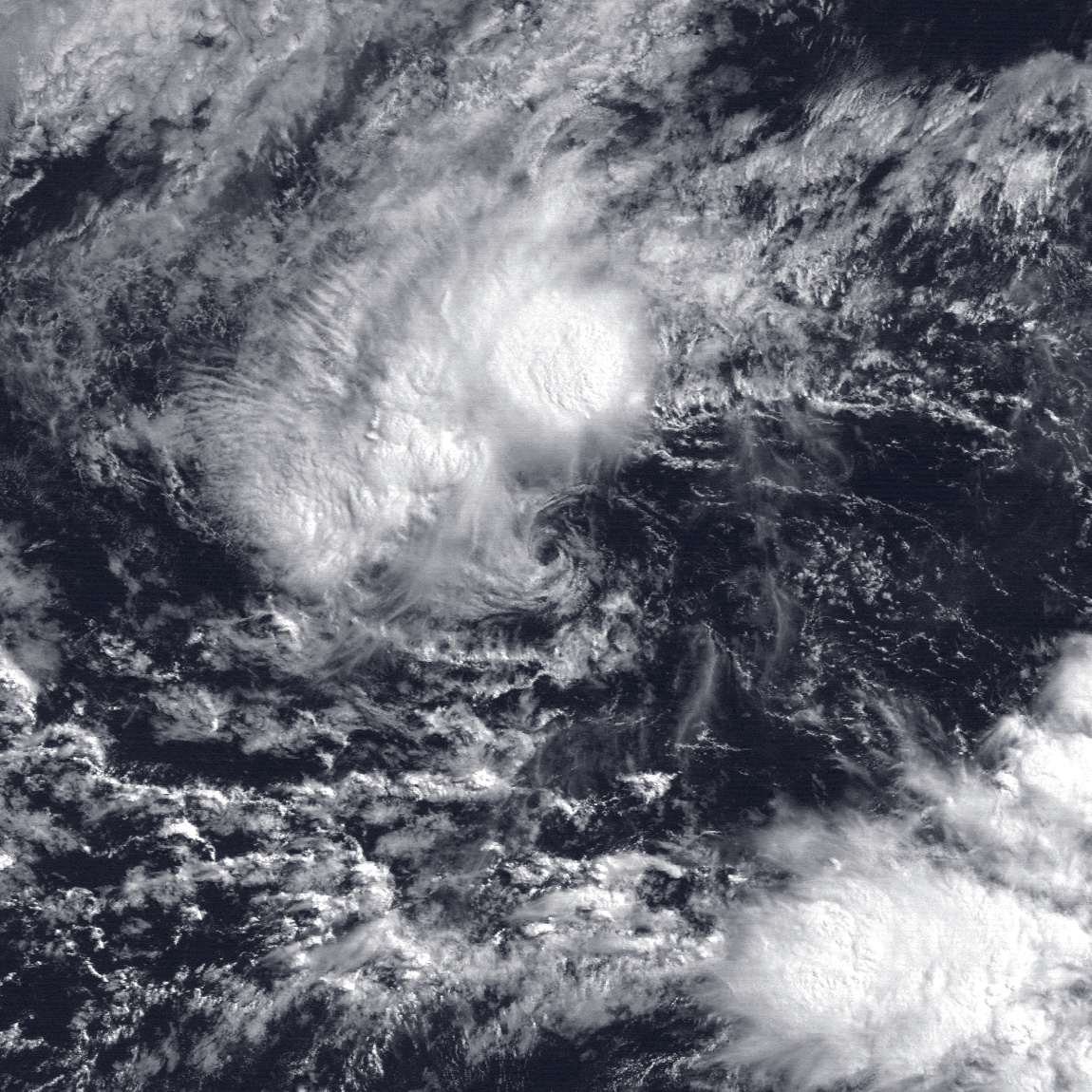
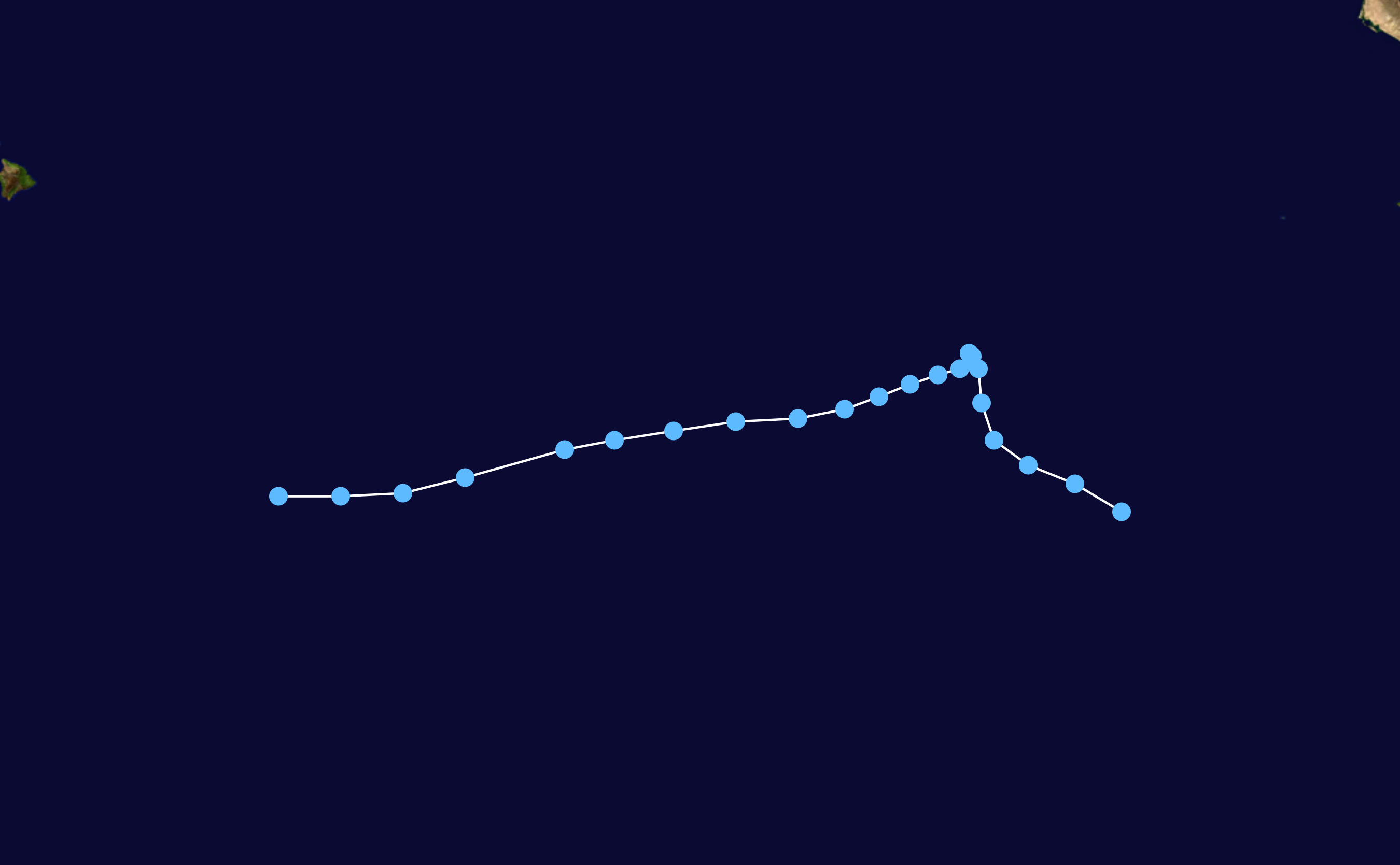
- Duration: July 10 – July 16
- Peak intensity: 35 mph (55 km/h) (1-min);

On July 10, a tropical depression formed far from land. Upon formation, there was uncertainty of the location of center. Shortly thereafter, the system became sheared and further intensification was no longer anticipated. On July 11, the low-level center became displaced form the deep convection. the next day, the center was relocated, and moved to the west. While the NHC noted the possibility of intensification, the depression was forecasted to dissipate in 36 hours. It failed to intensify, and moved into the Central Pacific on July 14. The fast-moving tropical depression dissipated two days later. The remnants of the depression passed far to the south of Hawaii, thus there was no damage.

=== Hurricane Dalilia ===
- Category 1 hurricane (SSHWS)
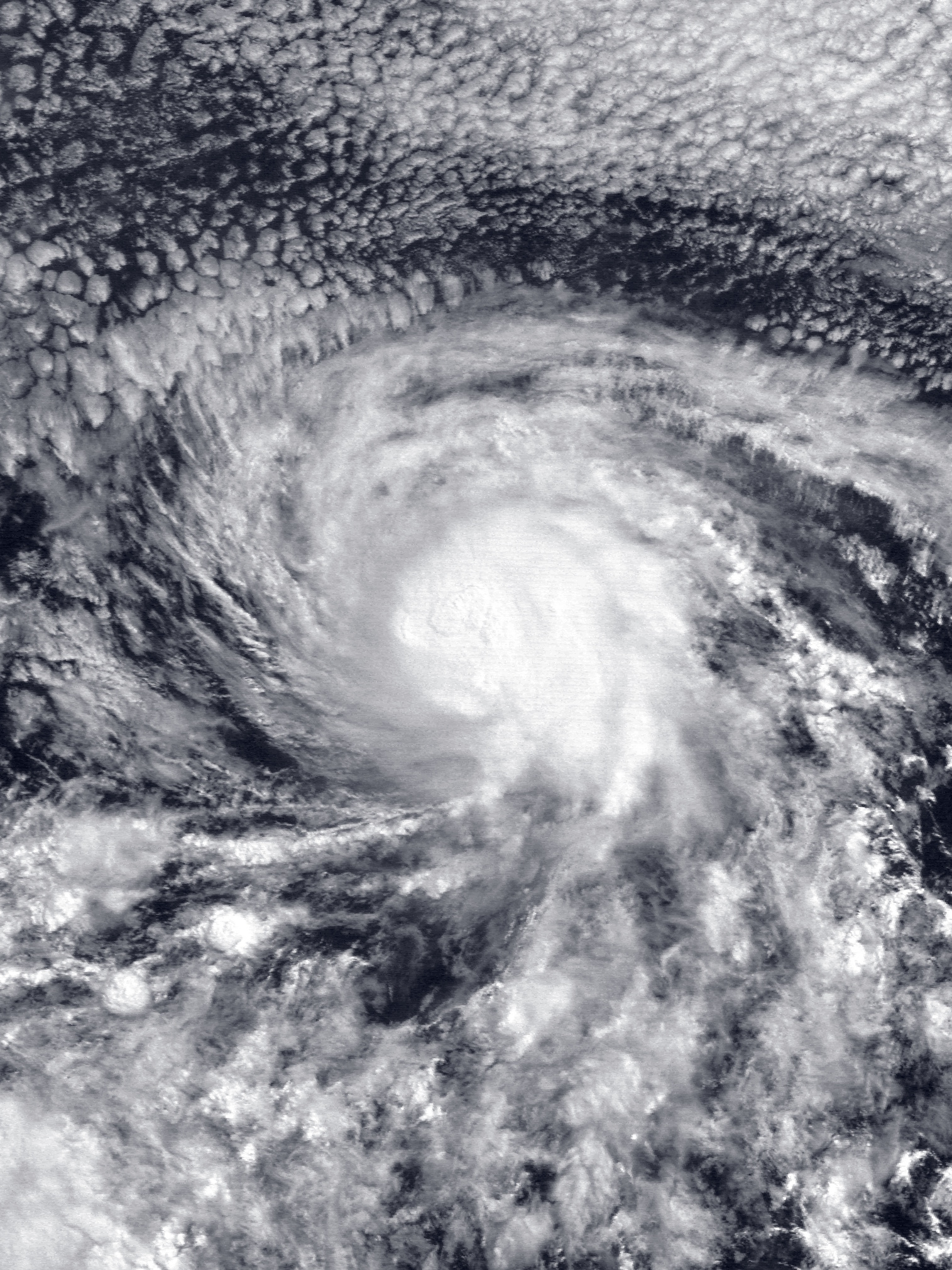
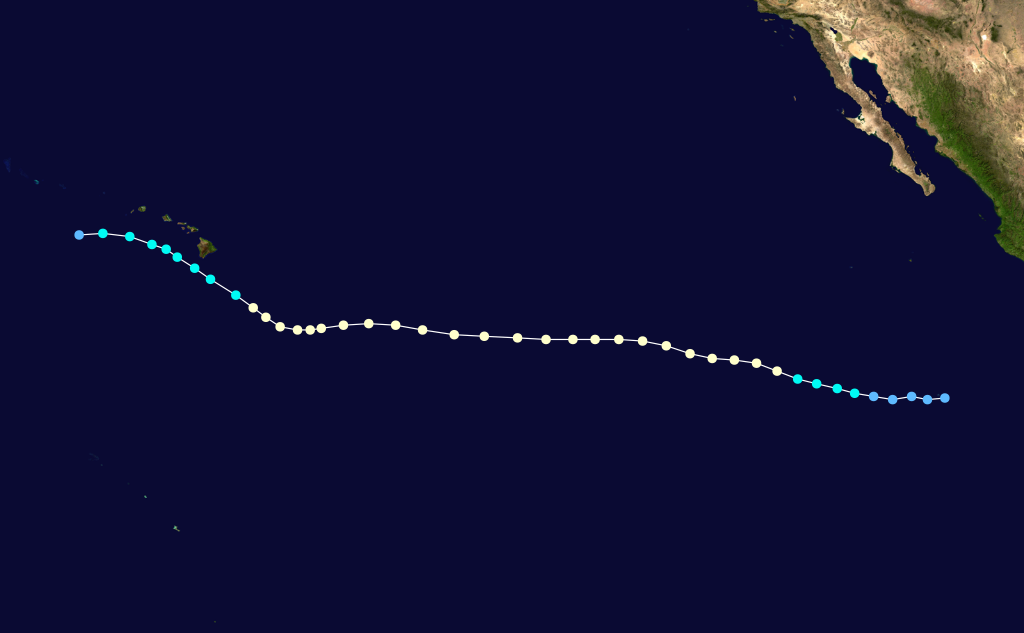
- Duration: July 11 – July 21
- Peak intensity: 90 mph (150 km/h) (1-min); 977 mbar (hPa)

On July 9, a defined low-pressure system formed south of Baja California and increased convective activity led to the NHC classifying it Tropical Depression Six-E on July 11. About 24 hours later, the depression intensified into Tropical Storm Dalilia. By July 13, Dalilia had intensified into a minimal hurricane as it tracked generally toward the northwest. Two days later, the storm took a nearly due west track, which it maintained until July 19. Although the storm tracked near cool waters, a well-developed outflow allowed it to maintain hurricane-intensity. Shortly before crossing into the Central Pacific basin, the storm reached its peak intensity with winds of 90 mph (150 km/h) and a central pressure of 977 mbar (hPa; 28.85 inHg). After crossing 140°W, Dalilia weakened to a minimal hurricane. The storm maintained this intensity until July 19, at which time the system slowed and turned northwest. The following day, the weakening tropical storm brushed the Hawaiian Islands to the south, eventually curving away from the island chain on July 21. Later that day, Dalilia further weakened to a tropical depression, with the Central Pacific Hurricane Center issuing their final advisory at that time. The remnants of the former hurricane continued to track northwest.

While tracking near the Hawaiian islands, Dalilia produced waves up to 20 ft (6.1 m) along south-facing coastlines. Along the coasts of Ka'u and South Kona, winds gusted up to 45 mph (75 km/h); the winds caused minor damage Along the southeast slopes of Mauna Loa, heavy rains caused minor flooding which forced transit officials to shut down several roads. Localized areas received rainfall in excess of 10 in (250 mm).

=== Tropical Depression Seven-E ===
- Tropical depression (SSHWS)
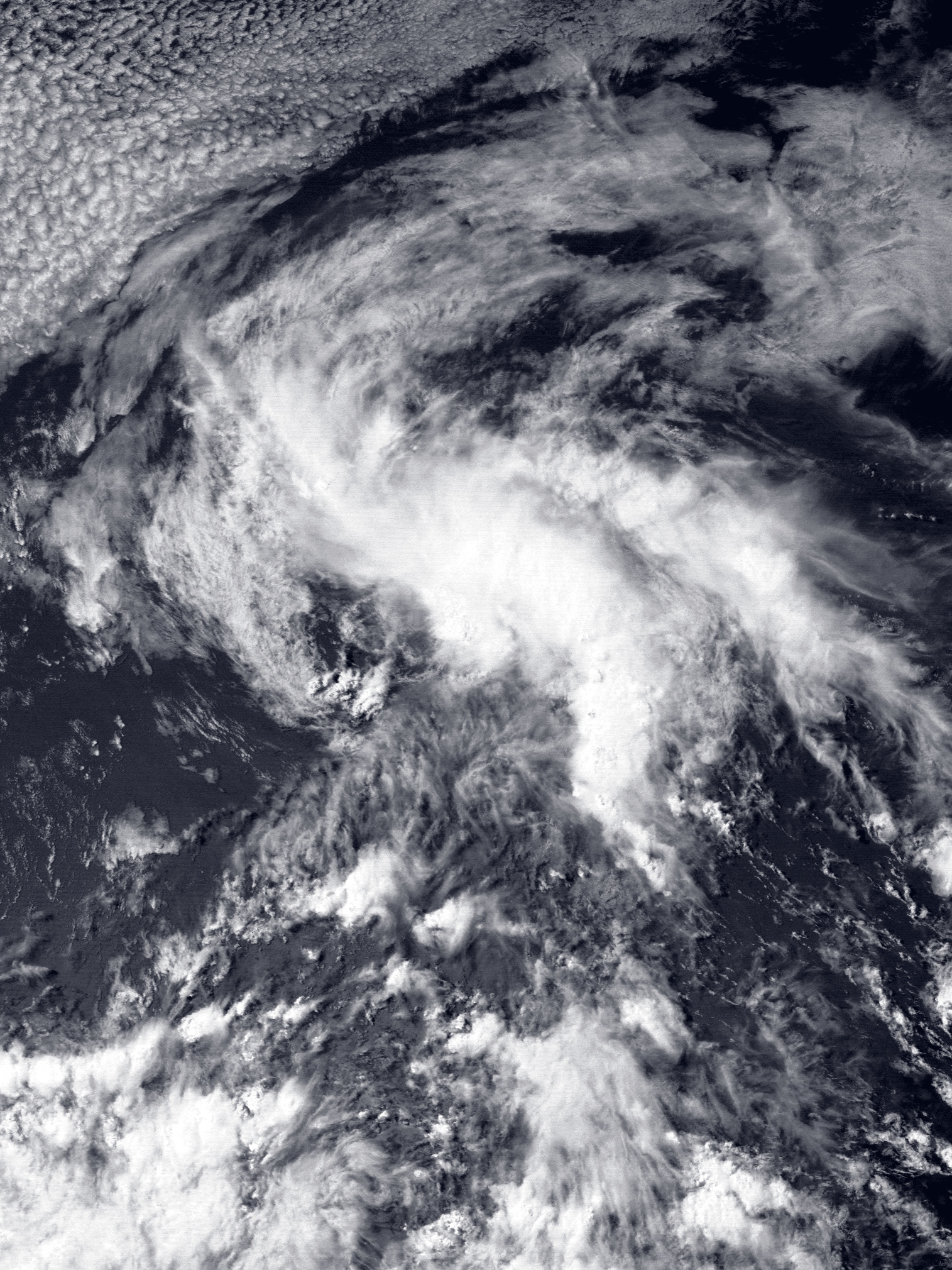
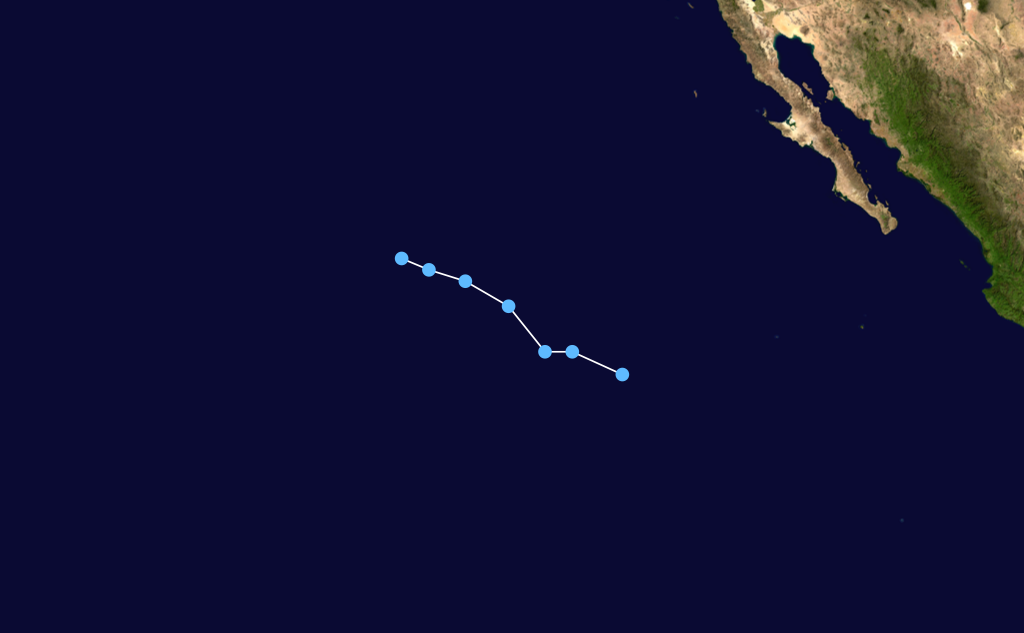
- Duration: July 16 – July 18
- Peak intensity: 35 mph (55 km/h) (1-min);

On July 16, an area of disturbed weather located 900 mi (1,400 km) organized into a tropical depression. Upon formation, the NHC did not anticipate significant intensification due to it close distance to both cooler waters and Hurricane Dalilia. The next day, however, the center became difficult to locate and the system was no longer forecast to intensity. By the night, only minimal deep convection remained. The depression soon moved into cold water and as such the system was expected to dissipate within 24 hours. It dissipated the next day. The remnants of this system contributed to a surge in the monsoon trough that led to the formation of Tropical Storm Erick. This system never impacted land, and thus no damage or deaths were reported.

=== Tropical Storm Erick ===
- Tropical storm (SSHWS)
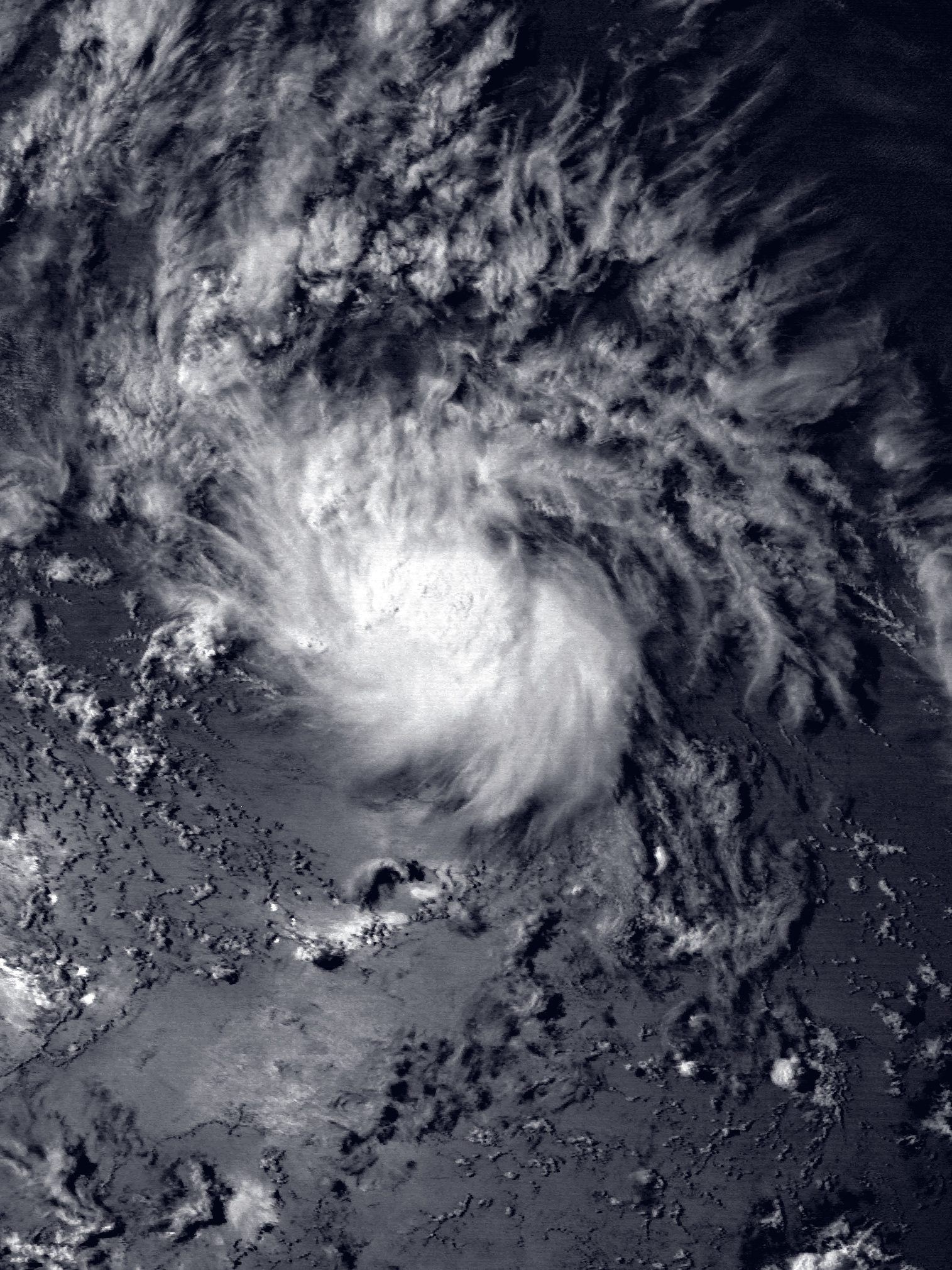
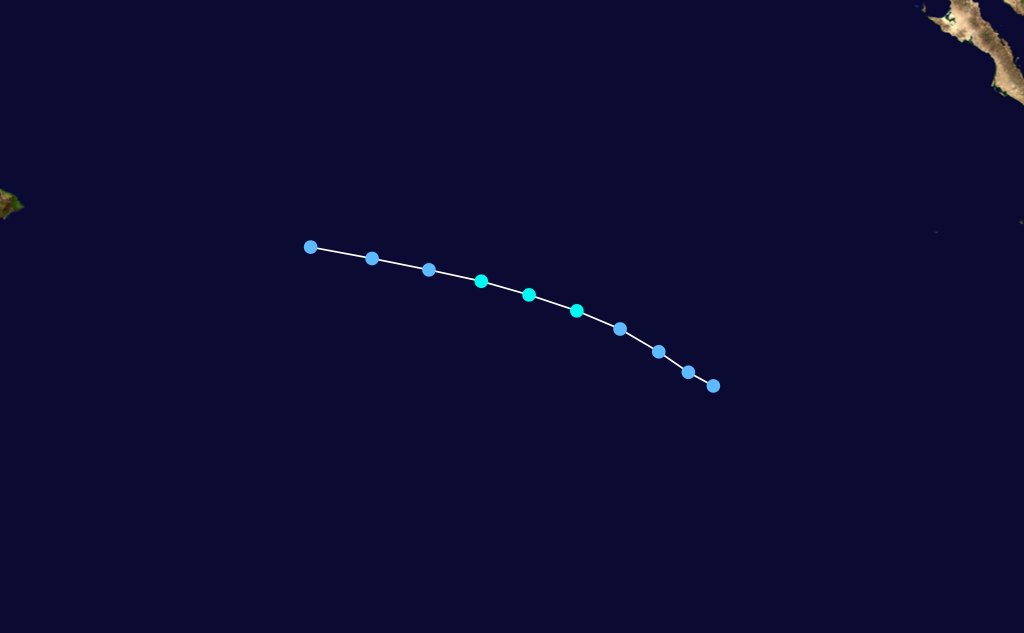
- Duration: July 19 – July 21
- Peak intensity: 40 mph (65 km/h) (1-min); 1005 mbar (hPa)

On July 16, there was a surge in convection in the monsoon trough. The most concentrated area soon separated for the trough and by July 19, satellite imagery indicated an area of deep convection that was located nearly 1,237 mi (1,991 km) away from Mexico. Early that day, the system was upgraded to a tropical depression. Upon becoming a tropical cyclone, only slight intensification was anticipated. The system intensified to a tropical storm 24 hours after forming. Erick soon moved into cooler waters. This quickly weakened the cyclone and was downgraded to a tropical depression on July 20. It dissipated the next day, without ever impacting any land masses.

=== Tropical Storm Flossie ===
- Tropical storm (SSHWS)
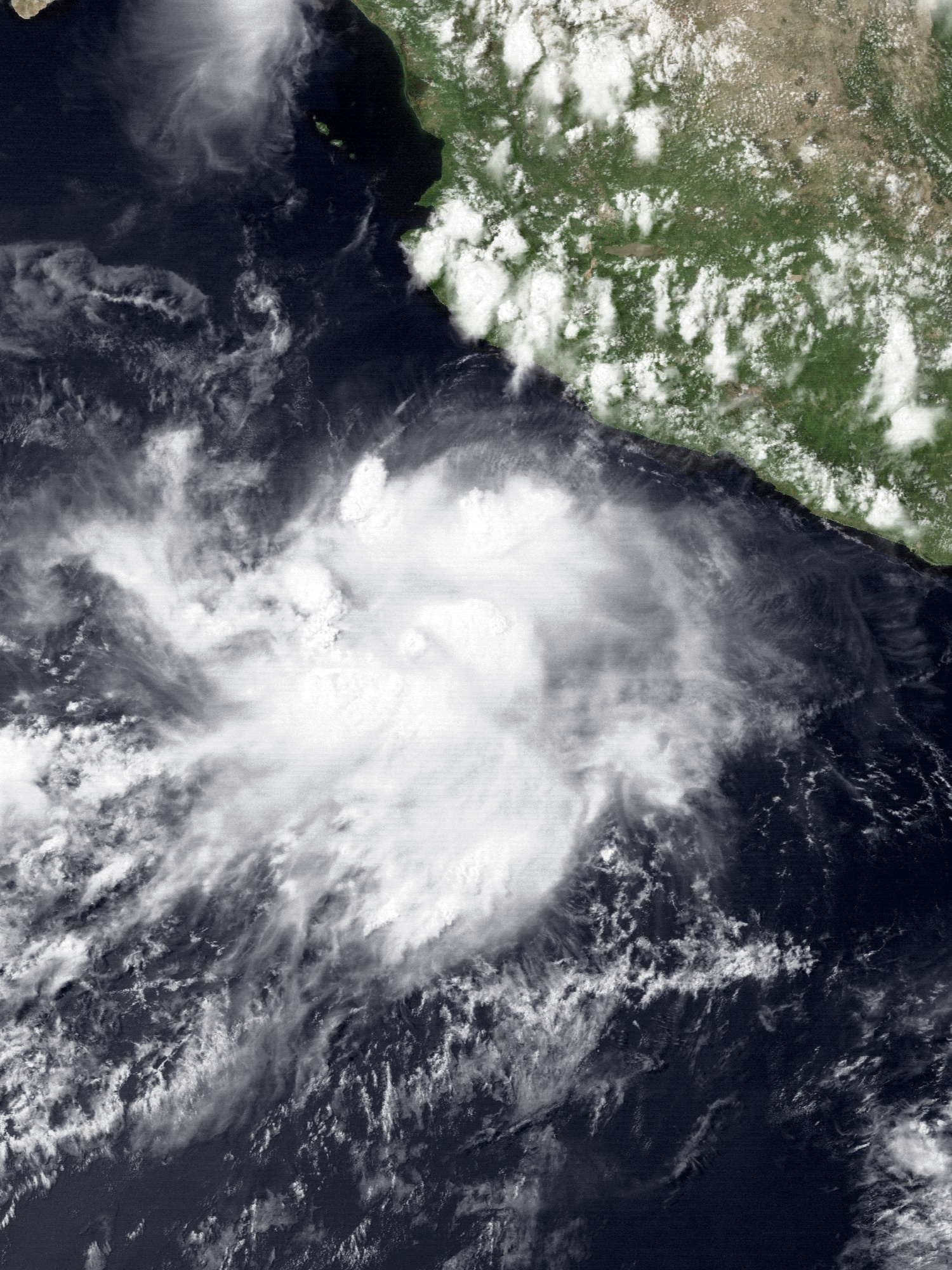
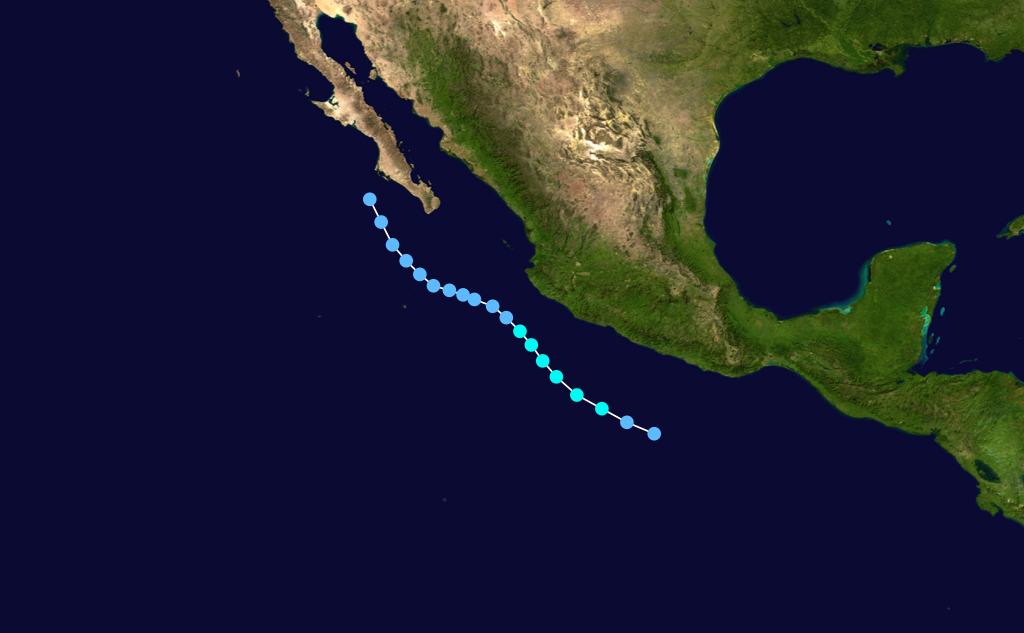
- Duration: July 23 – July 28
- Peak intensity: 40 mph (65 km/h) (1-min); 1004 mbar (hPa)

Flossie originated from a tropical wave that entered the Pacific Ocean on July 20. The system began to show signs of organization two days later. Continuing to organize, the system was upgraded Tropical Depression Nine-E on July 23. Despite being located over warm waters, only gradual intensification was anticipated. It strengthened into Tropical Storm Flossie the next day. Shortly thereafter the upgraded, convection began to diminish. The cyclone then drifted northwest. The upper-level environment rapidly changed, and the cyclones convection became disorganized. The convection separated from the center of circulation. The cluster of convection developed a new center of circulation on July 24. The original center drifted away from Flossie for 12 hours before dissipating. The new center, which was still a tropical storm, drifted northwest. Flossie then encountered an unfavorable environment, and weakened into a depression on July 25. Flossie continued drifting to the northwest until dissipating July 28, while just off the coast of the Baja California Peninsula. Despite its close distance to Mexico, no damage or deaths were reported.

=== Hurricane Gil ===
- Category 1 hurricane (SSHWS)
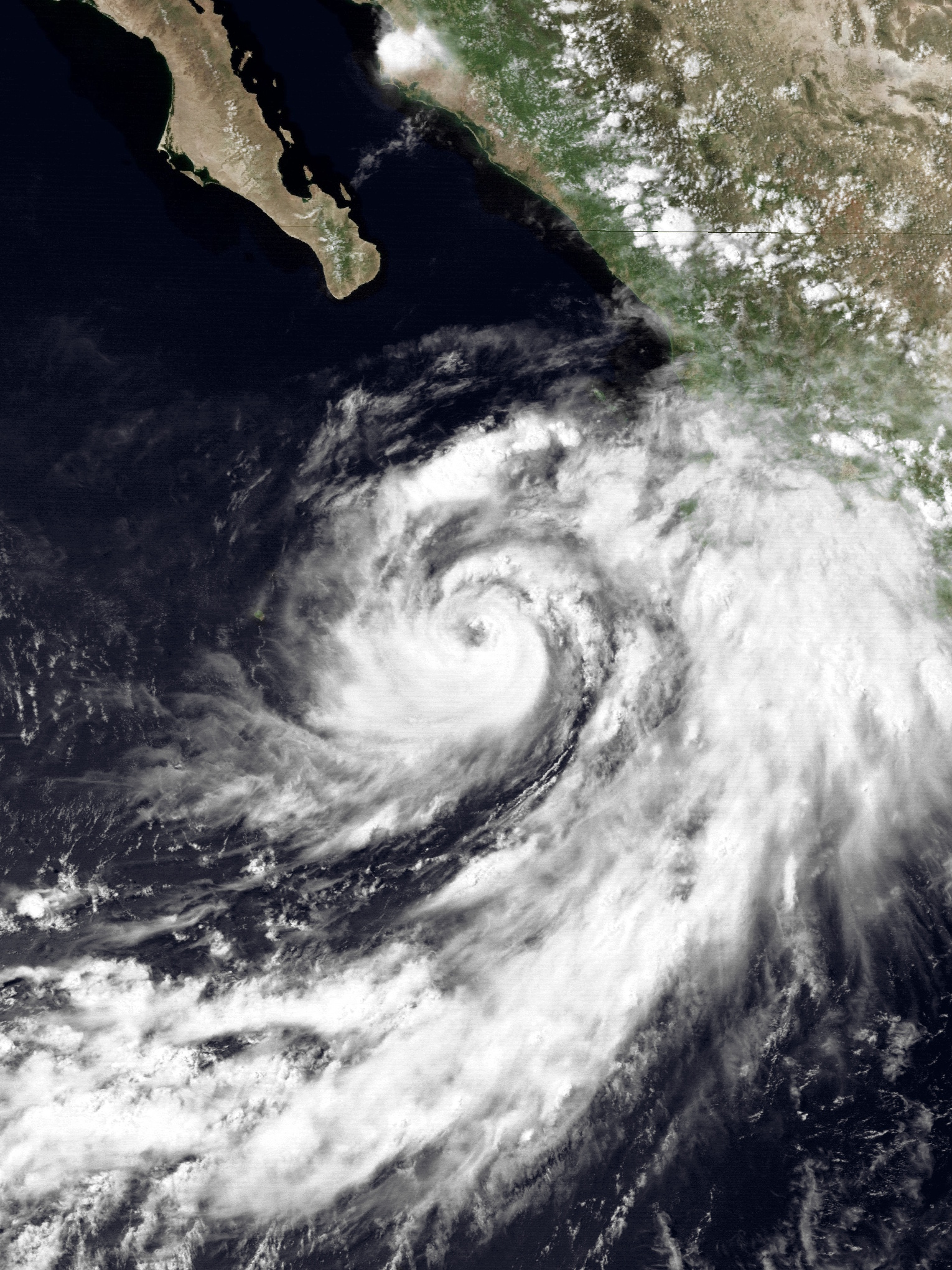
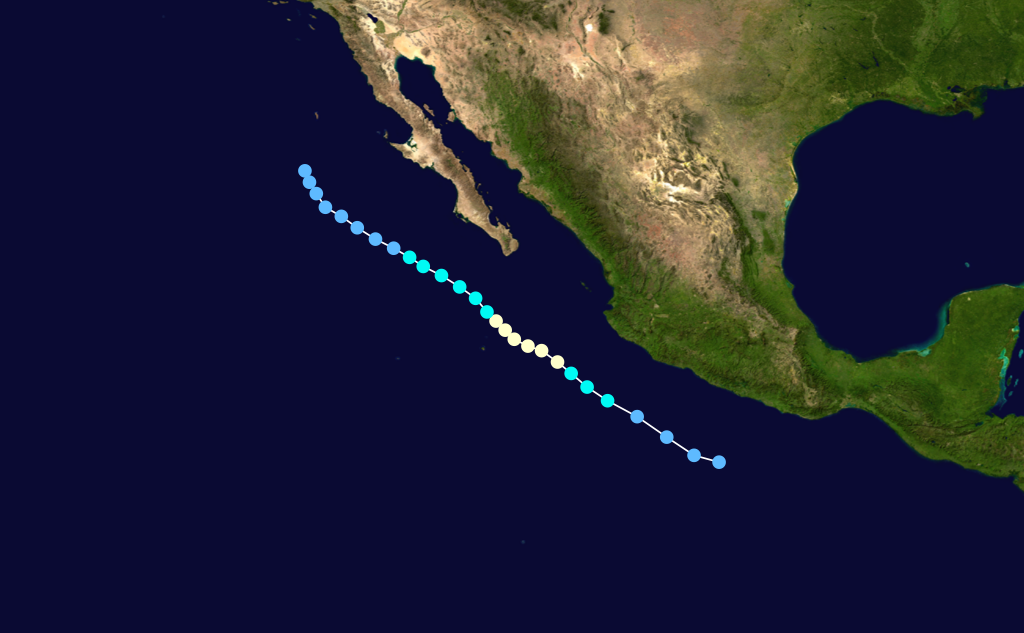
- Duration: July 30 – August 5
- Peak intensity: 85 mph (140 km/h) (1-min); 979 mbar (hPa)

Gil formed from an area of disturbed weather located near the Mexico–Guatemala border developed a circulation in the Gulf of Tehuantepec and then dissipated. On July 30, the disturbance redeveloped a circulation and then convection. It paralleled the coast of Mexico and headed in a northwesterly direction. The low continued to organize, and was upgraded into a tropical depression. Initially, there was some uncertain in the storms future path, and there was a possibility of the system recurving towards the coast. It strengthened into a tropical storm on July 31. The system continued to become better organized, with further intensification foretasted because the low was located over very warm waters; and was upgraded into a hurricane that same day. Shortly thereafter, the cyclone developed an eye. Gil was a hurricane for only about 30 hours, and it began to encounter dry air. By the August 1, Gil had lost hurricane intensity. It was downgraded to a tropical depression the next day. The cyclone dissipated on August 5.

The outer bands of Gil produced significant amounts of rainfall over coastal areas of Mexico, with satellites estimating areas of rainfall in excess of 5 in (130 mm). The heavy rains may have triggered deadly flooding and landslides; however, no reports from Mexican officials have been received to confirm this. However, officials reported 4.8 in (120 mm) of rain in a 12-hour period.

=== Hurricane Ismael ===
- Category 3 hurricane (SSHWS)
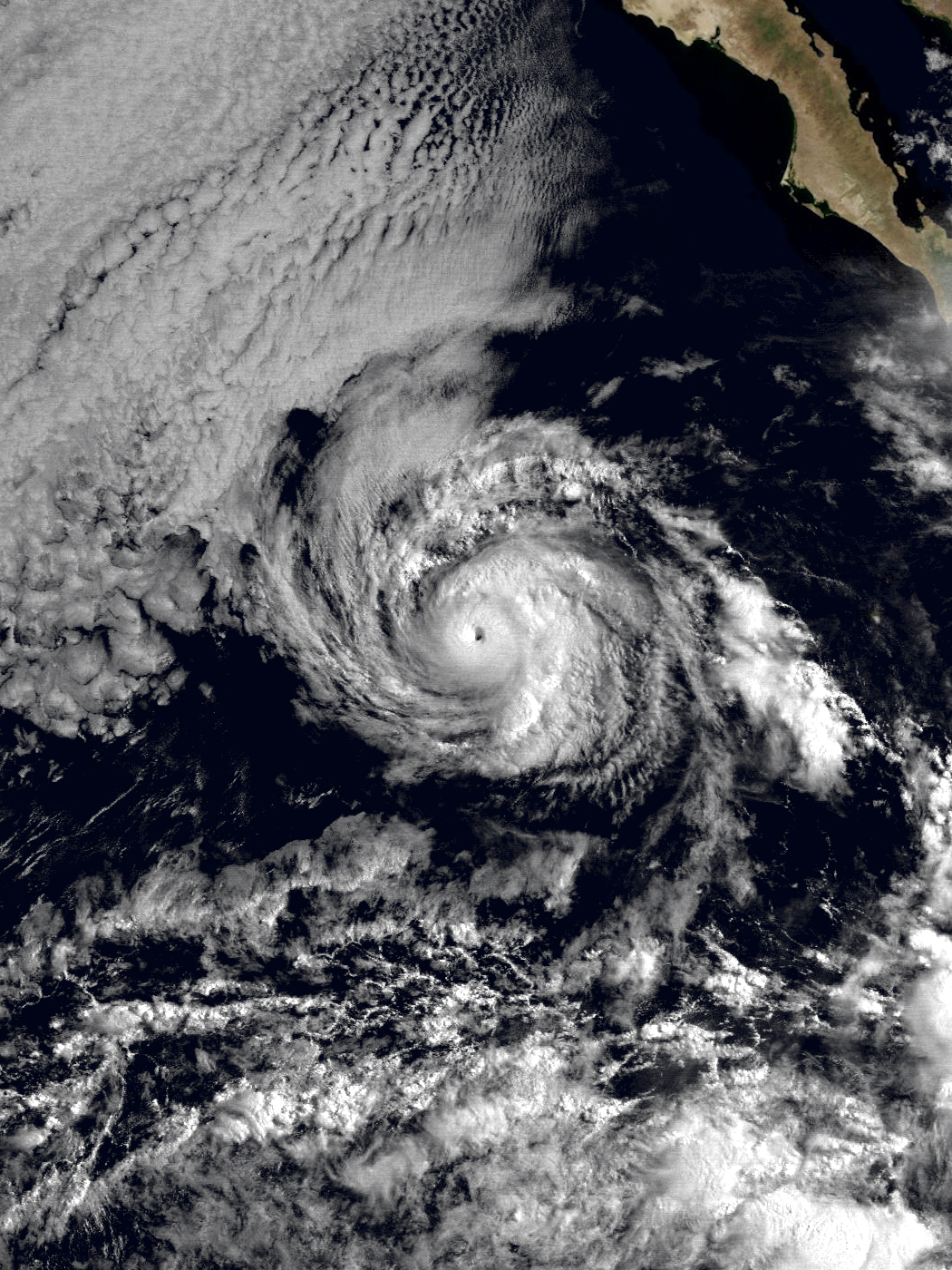
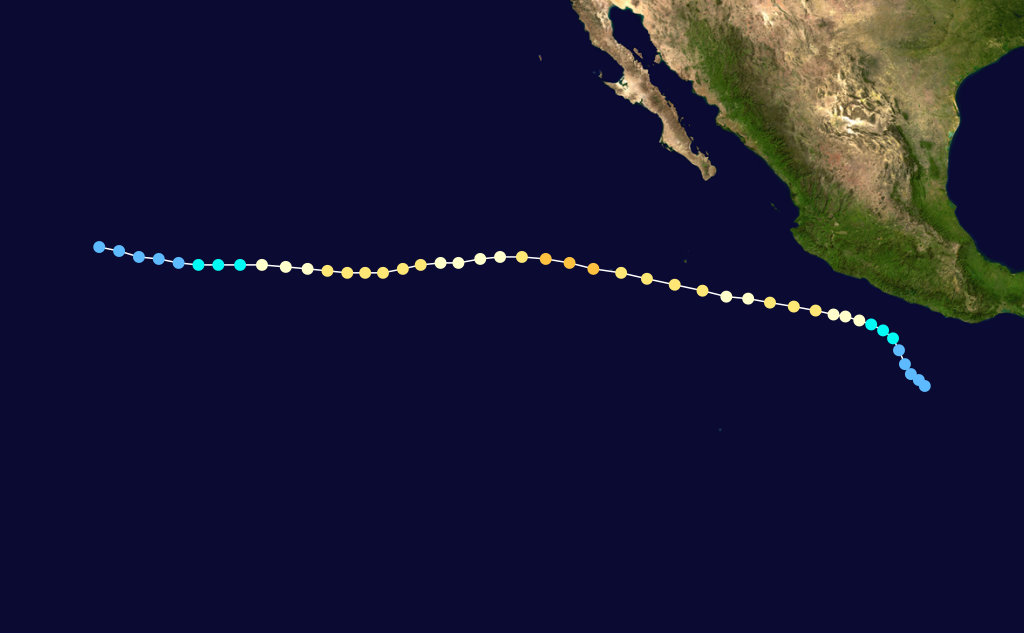
- Duration: August 14 – August 25
- Peak intensity: 120 mph (195 km/h) (1-min); 955 mbar (hPa)

A tropical wave emerged western Africa on July 31, which moved across the Atlantic and Caribbean without any development. On August 11, it crossed Central America into the eastern Pacific. On August 14, the system became more organized, developing into a tropical depression off the coast of Mexico. Moving northwest, it strengthened into Tropical Storm Ismael on August 15, as it developed outflow and banding features. The storm moved northwestward toward the southwest Mexican coast before turning back to the west due to a large high pressure system to its north. On August 16, Ismael attained hurricane status, and strengthened further to a Category 2 hurricane a day later. The intensity fluctuated due to the presence of wind shear in the area. After weakening slightly, the hurricane re-intensified and attained peak winds of 120 mph (195 km/h) and a minimum pressure of 955 millibars on August 19. Around this time, Ismael interacted with a nearby tropical wave, helping to spawn Tropical Storm Juliette. Cooler waters and stronger wind shear prevented further strengthening, and Ismael fell to tropical storm status on August 23. A day later, Ismael weakened to a tropical depression, and the storm degenerated into a remnant low a day later as it crossed into the central Pacific.

Between August 15 and 17, the outer bands of Ismael produced heavy rains, flooding, and landslides along coastal areas of Mexico between Acapulco and Manzanillo, Colima. At least three people were killed by flooding triggered by the storm.

=== Tropical Storm Henriette ===
- Tropical storm (SSHWS)
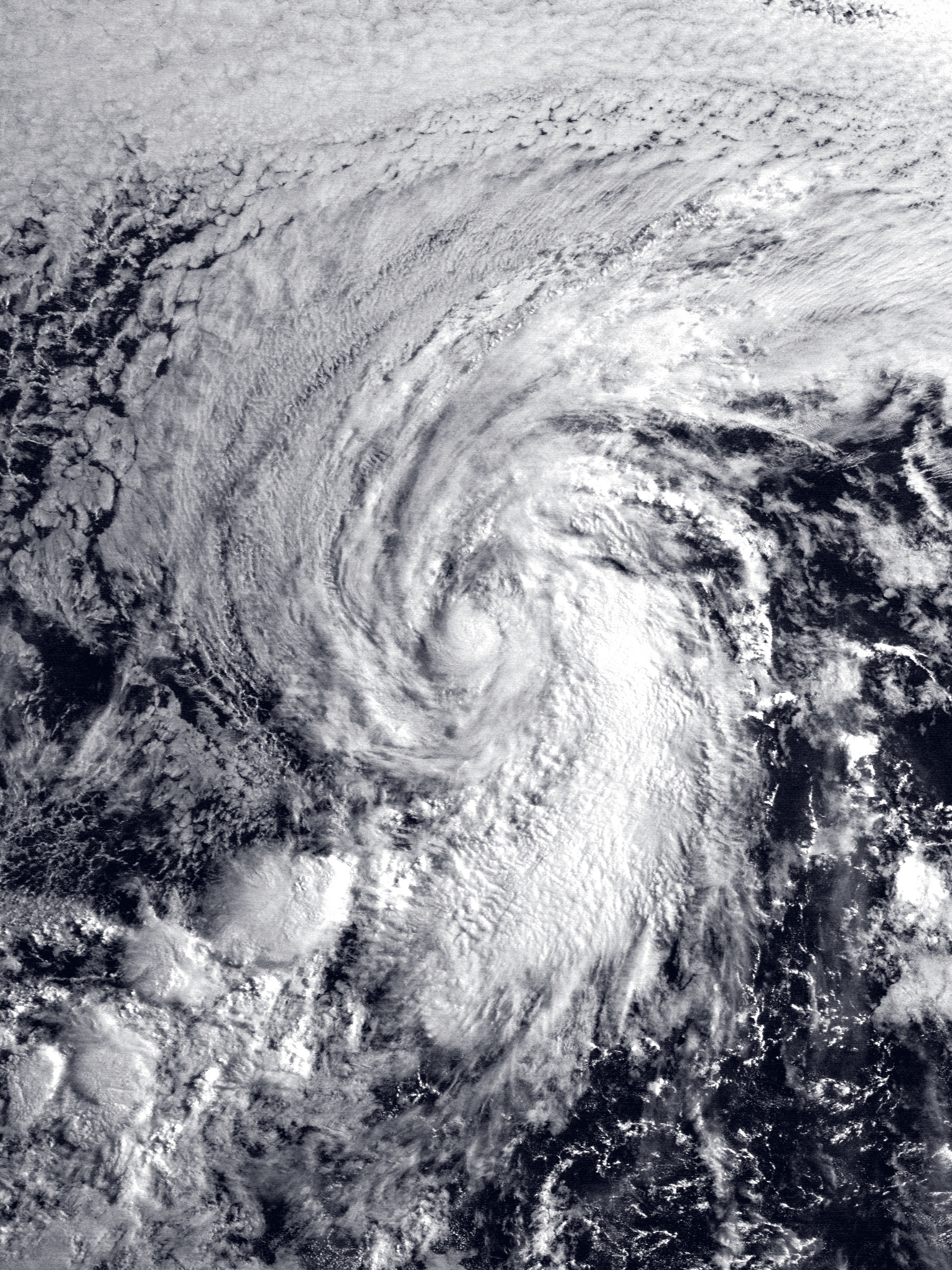
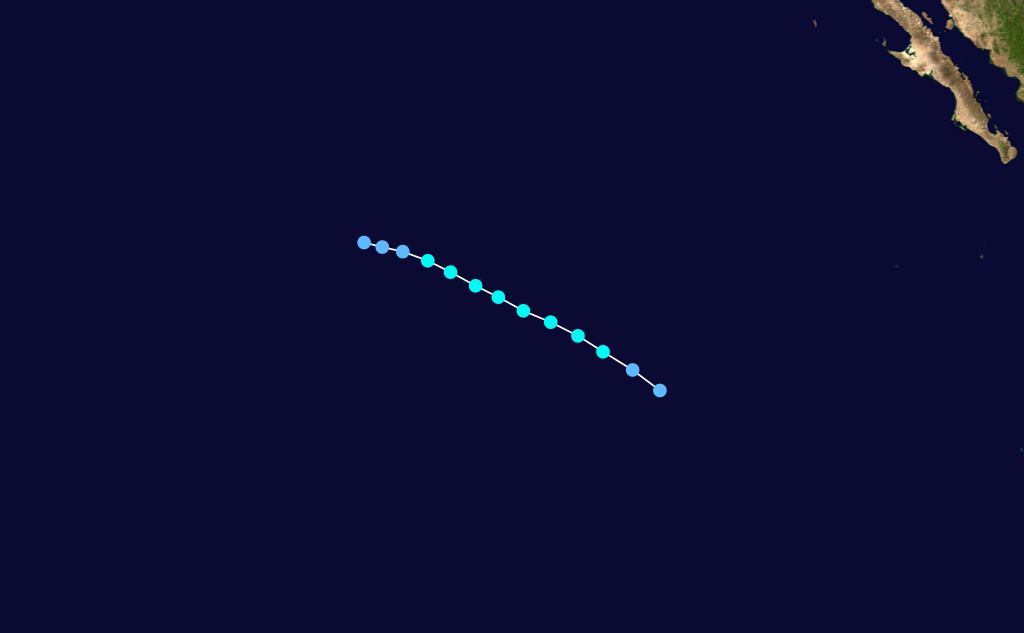
- Duration: August 15 – August 17
- Peak intensity: 50 mph (85 km/h) (1-min); 1000 mbar (hPa)

On August 12, a tropical wave formed in the Pacific Ocean. it steadily organized into the twelfth tropical depression of the season early on August 14. It slowly strengthened and was named Henriette after strengthening into a tropical storm. After peaking with winds of 50 mph (85 km/h) and a peak pressure of 1,000 mbar (30 inHg) on August 15, wind shear immediately began to weaken the tropical cyclone. On August 16, after becoming devoid of any convection, it was downgraded into tropical depression status on August 16. Henriette degenerated into a remnant low on August 17. The low persisted for a few more days until completely dissipating.

=== Tropical Storm Juliette ===
- Tropical storm (SSHWS)
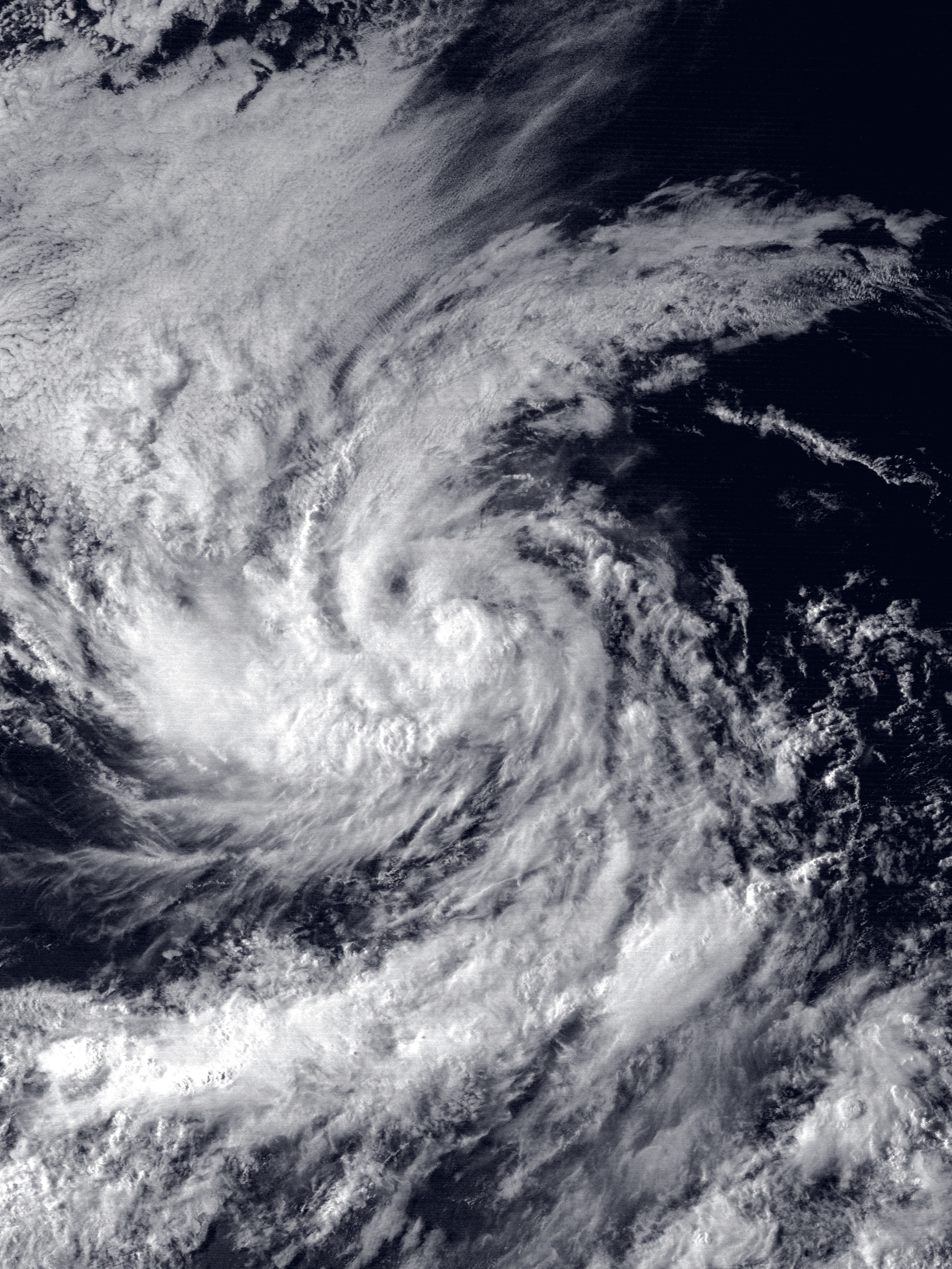
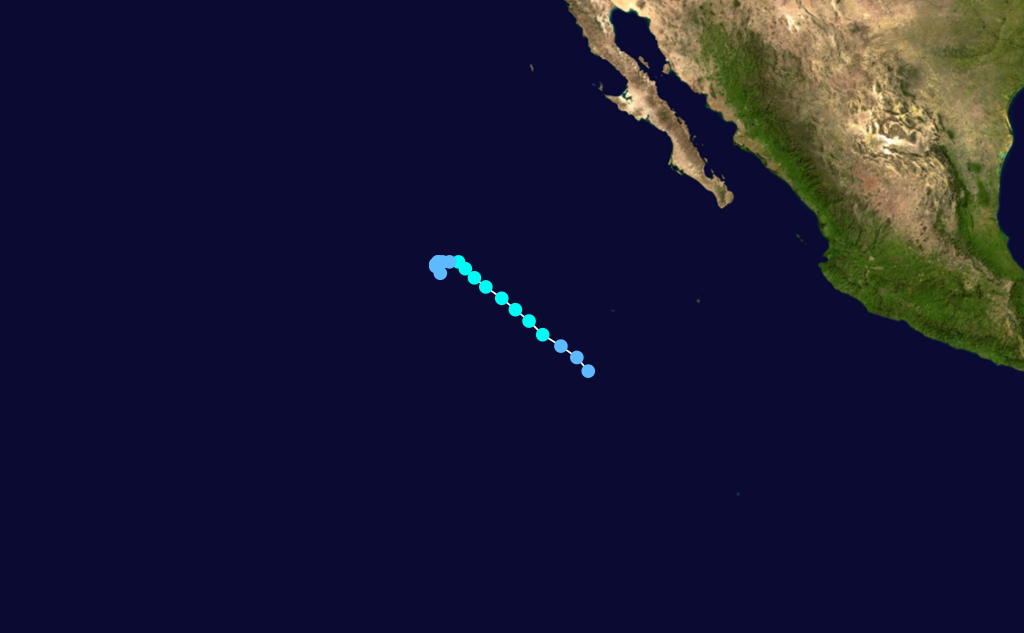
- Duration: August 21 – August 25
- Peak intensity: 65 mph (100 km/h) (1-min); 992 mbar (hPa)

A surge in convection in the monsoon trough caused by nearby Hurricane Ismael interacted with a tropical wave to form the thirteenth tropical depression of the season on August 21. Due to the small distance of 621 miles (999 km) between the cyclones, the depression followed Ismael. Despite strong wind shear caused by Ismael, the depression strengthened into Tropical Storm Juliette on August 22 as a strong burst of convection occurred. After Ismael dissipated, steering currents collapsed, and Juliette moved over cool waters in the open ocean for several days. In addition, strong wind shear took toll on the system. The low had completely dissipated during the evening of August 25.

=== Hurricane Kiko ===
- Category 3 hurricane (SSHWS)
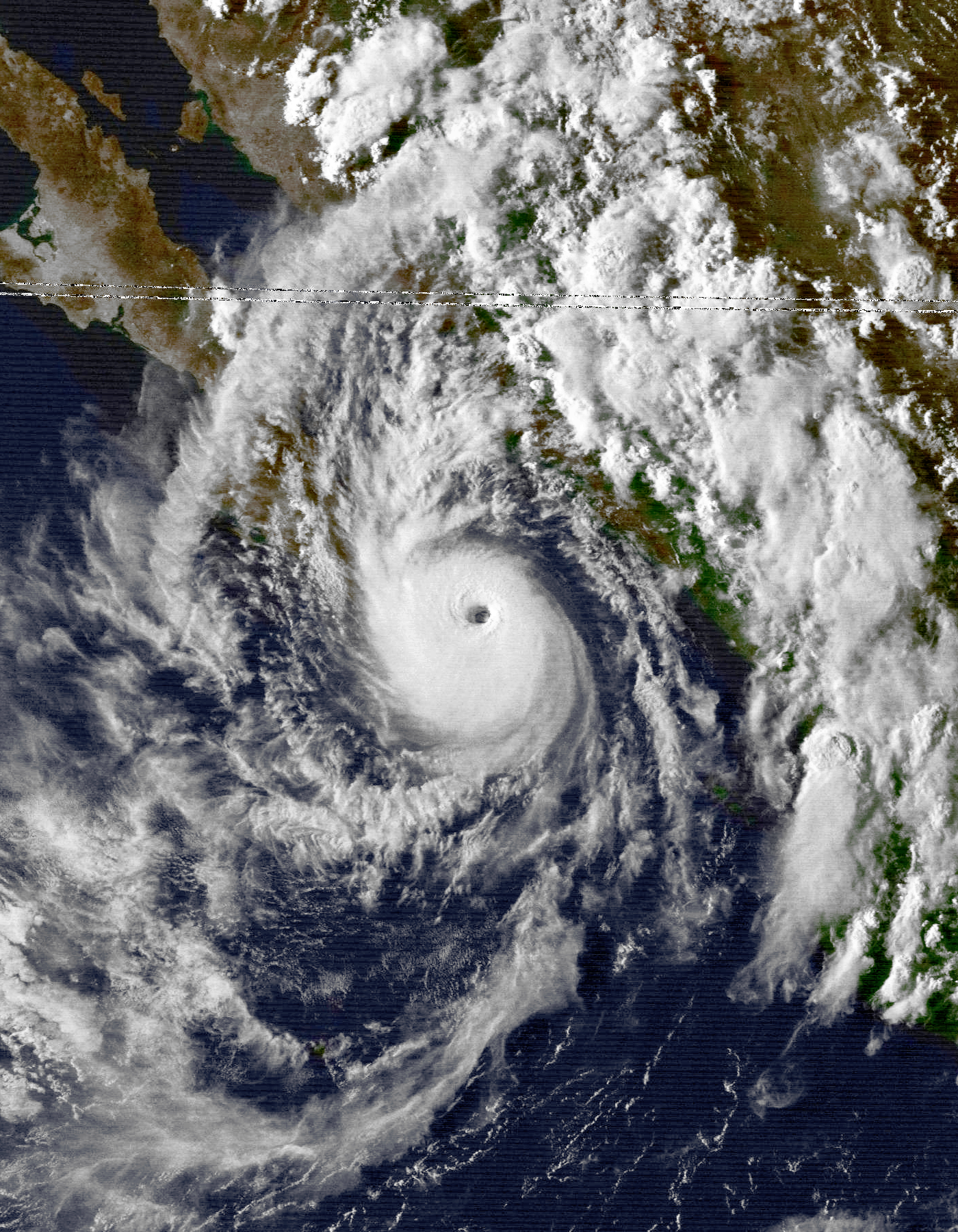
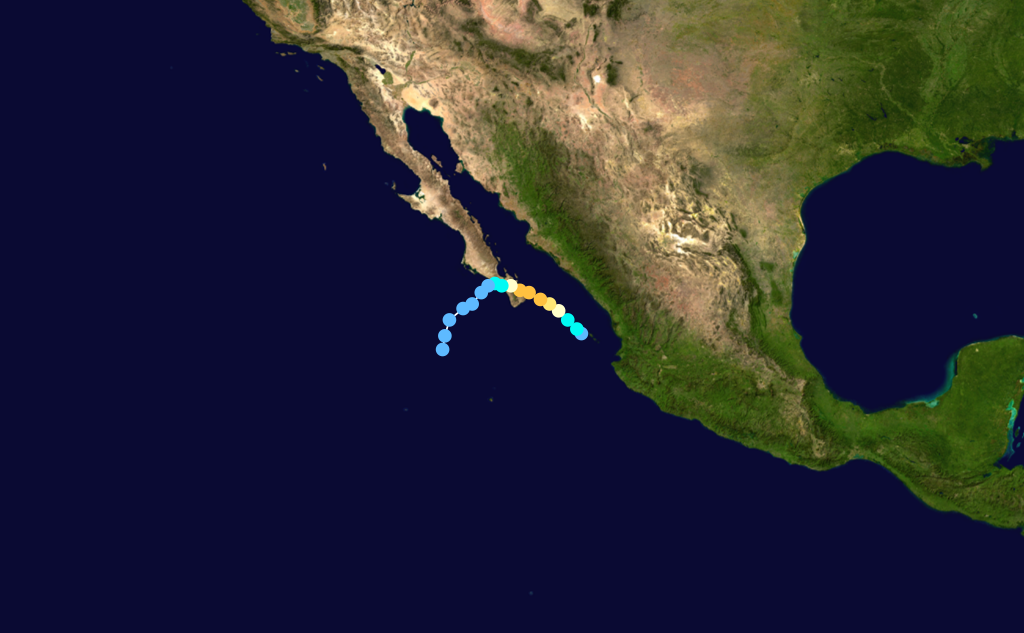
- Duration: August 25 – August 29
- Peak intensity: 120 mph (195 km/h) (1-min); 955 mbar (hPa)

On August 25, the season's fourteenth tropical depression formed off the coast of Sonora, Mexico from a mesoscale convective system. A small cyclone, the system rapidly intensified over the warm waters of the Gulf of California, becoming Tropical Storm Kiko hours after forming and a hurricane 12 hours later. The fast rate of strengthening continued until August 27, at which time Kiko peaked in intensity as a strong Category 3 hurricane with winds of 120 mph (195 km/h) and a minimum pressure of 955 mbar (hPa; 28.2 inHg). Slight weakening occurred before the storm made landfall near Punta Arena, Mexico, becoming one of the strongest storms to make landfall in Mexico since reliable records began in 1949. The hurricane quickly weakened as it moved over the Baja Peninsula, being downgraded to a tropical depression before emerging into the Pacific Ocean on August 28. The following day, the remnants of Kiko were absorbed by the nearby Hurricane Lorena.

Although Kiko was a major hurricane upon landfall, little damage resulted from the storm. However, 20 homes were destroyed and numerous highways were flooded by torrential rains.

=== Hurricane Lorena ===
- Category 1 hurricane (SSHWS)
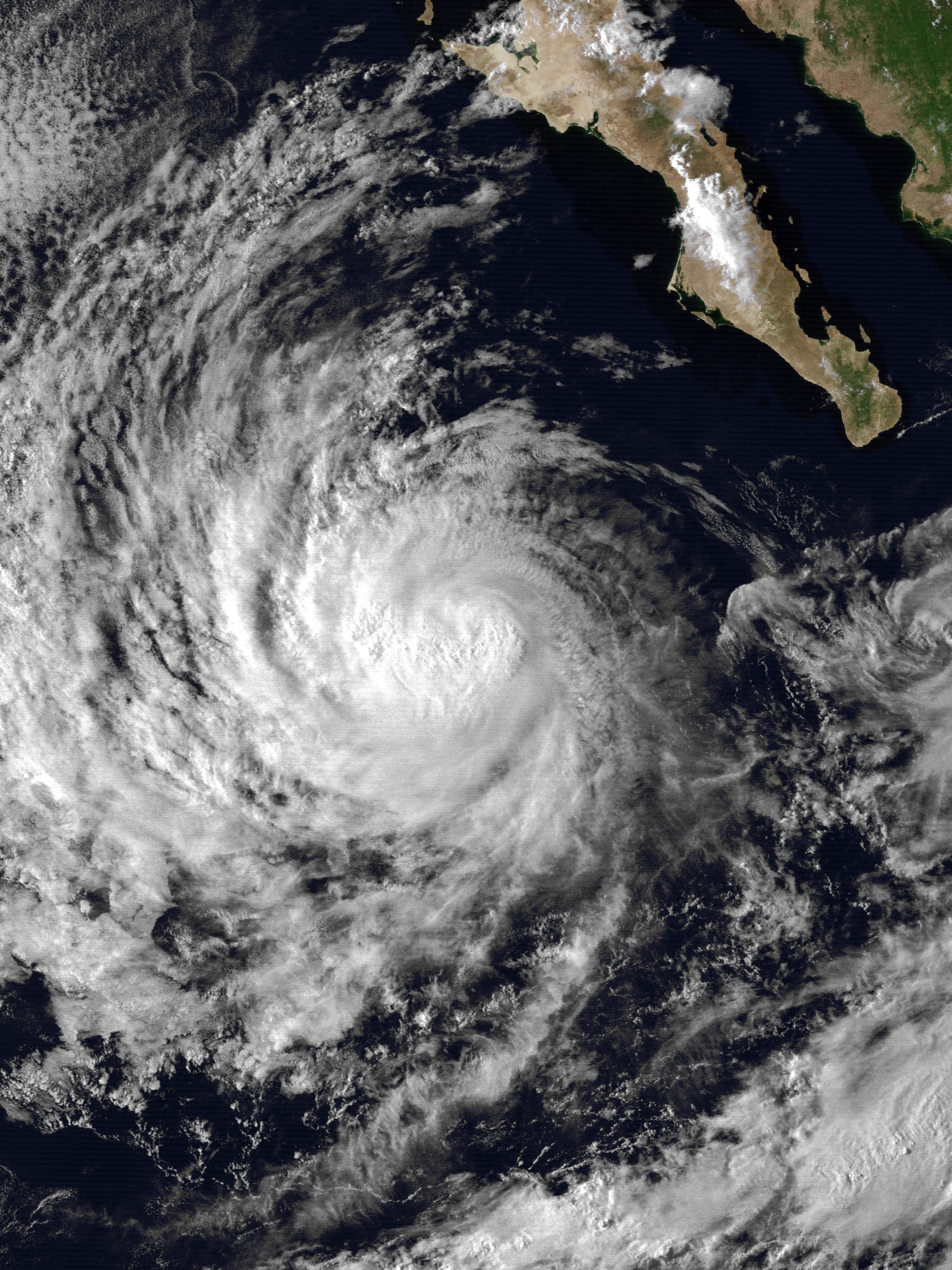
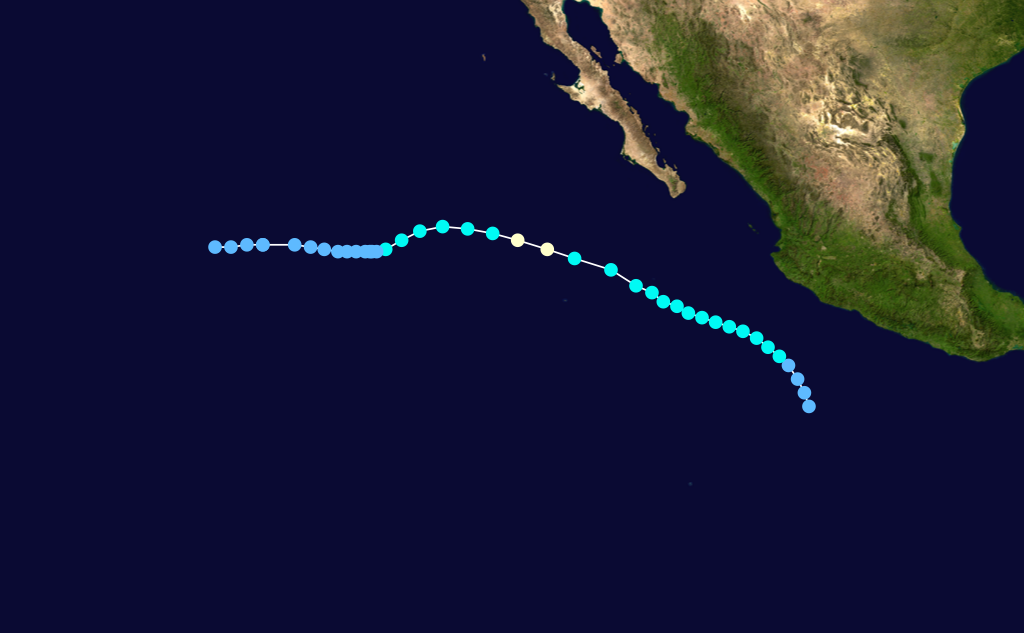
- Duration: August 27 – September 6
- Peak intensity: 75 mph (120 km/h) (1-min); 989 mbar (hPa)

In the Atlantic, a tropical wave spawned Tropical Depression Six. Twenty four hours later, wind shear degenerated the depression back into a wave. The wave continued westward, and in the southern Caribbean, split in two on August 21. The southern part crossed Central America and emerged into the Pacific Ocean. Banding and convection steadily organized, and Tropical Depression Fifteen-E formed on August 27. It strengthened into Tropical Storm Lorena the next day. At this time, three systems were active and in close proximity. Lorena and a weakening Kiko started a Fujiwhara interaction. Lorena eventually became the dominant system, and absorbed the remnants of Kiko on August 29. Moving slowly out to sea, Lorena reached minimal hurricane strength on the September 1 as the convection became more concentrated. Lorena was a hurricane for less than a day. It weakened quickly to a depression on September 3. The cyclone was devoid of convection by September 7, and was thus declared a remnant low. The system never affected land.

=== Tropical Storm Manuel ===
- Tropical storm (SSHWS)
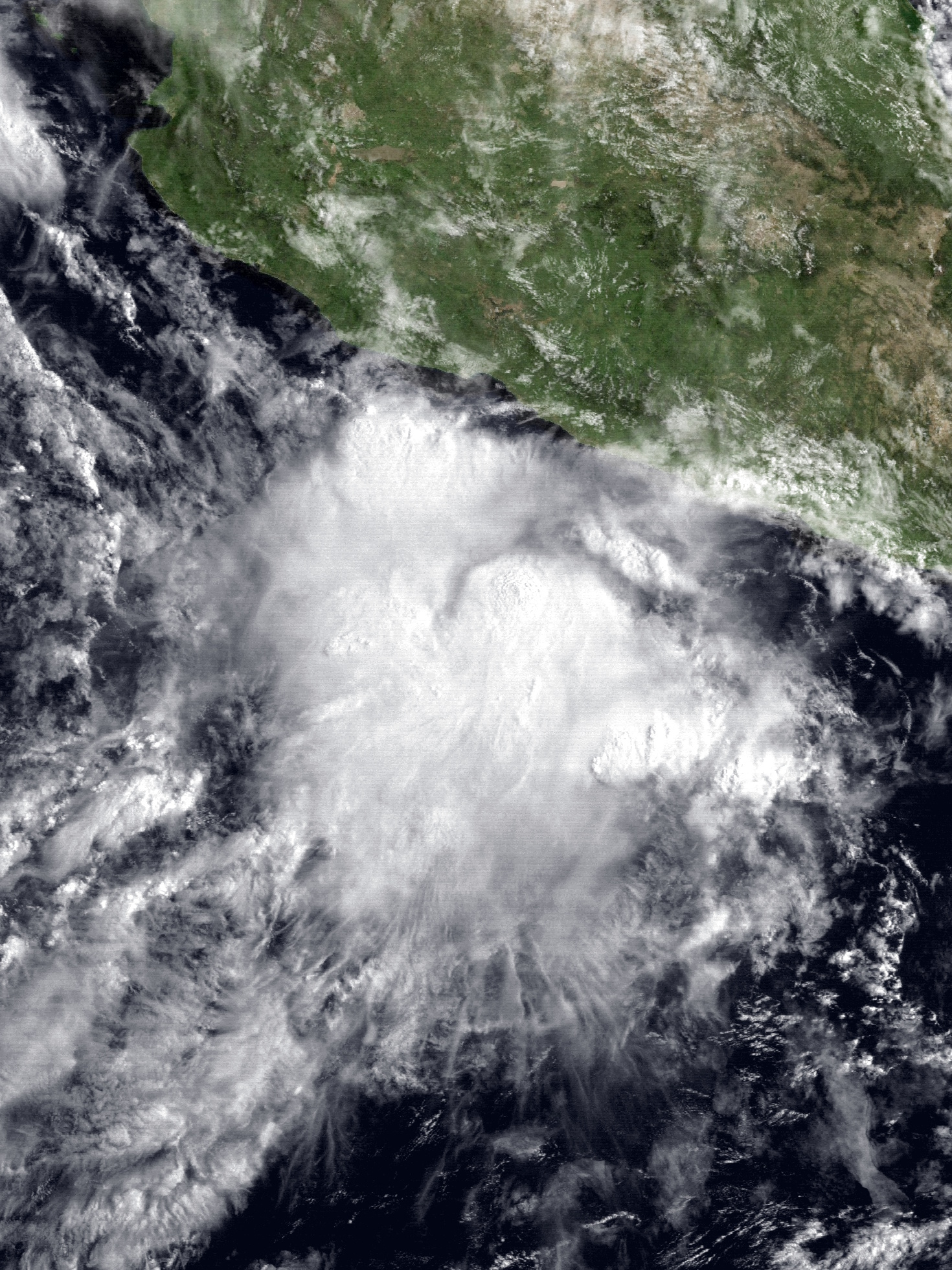
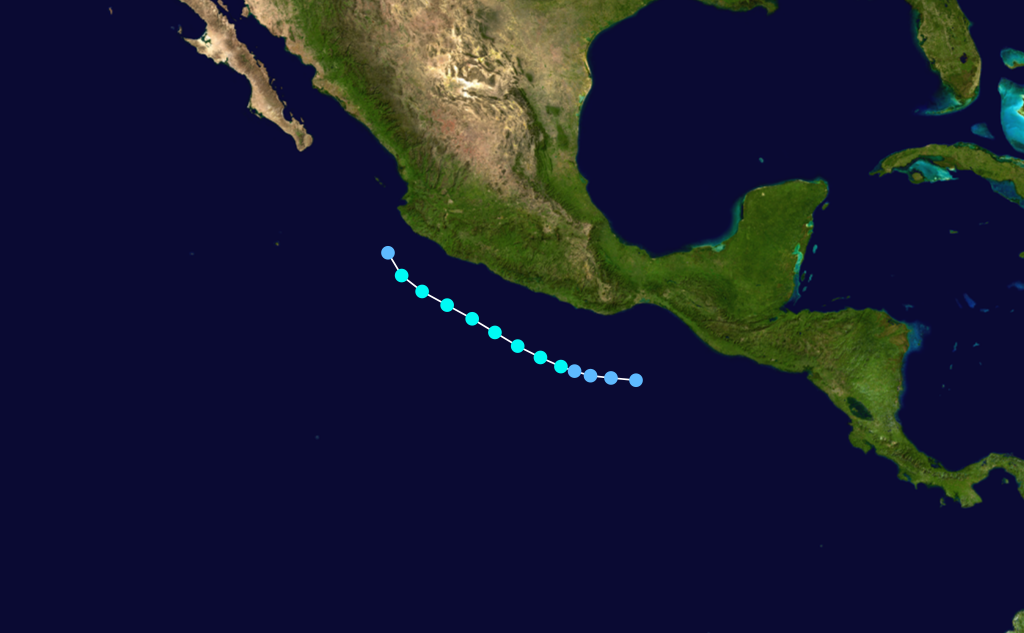
- Duration: August 28 – August 31
- Peak intensity: 45 mph (75 km/h) (1-min); 1002 mbar (hPa)

An area of thunderstorms organized into a tropical depression on August 28. The next day, convection increased near the center, and was respectively upgraded into a tropical storm. Manuel gradually strengthened, reaching a peak of 45 mph (75 km/h). Manuel approached to within 578 mi (930 km) of Lorena. Due to its proximity to the storm, Manuel lost its center circulation on August 31. The storms only impact on land was light rainfall near Manzanillo, Colima. No reports of death or damage were reported.

=== Tropical Storm Narda ===
- Tropical storm (SSHWS)
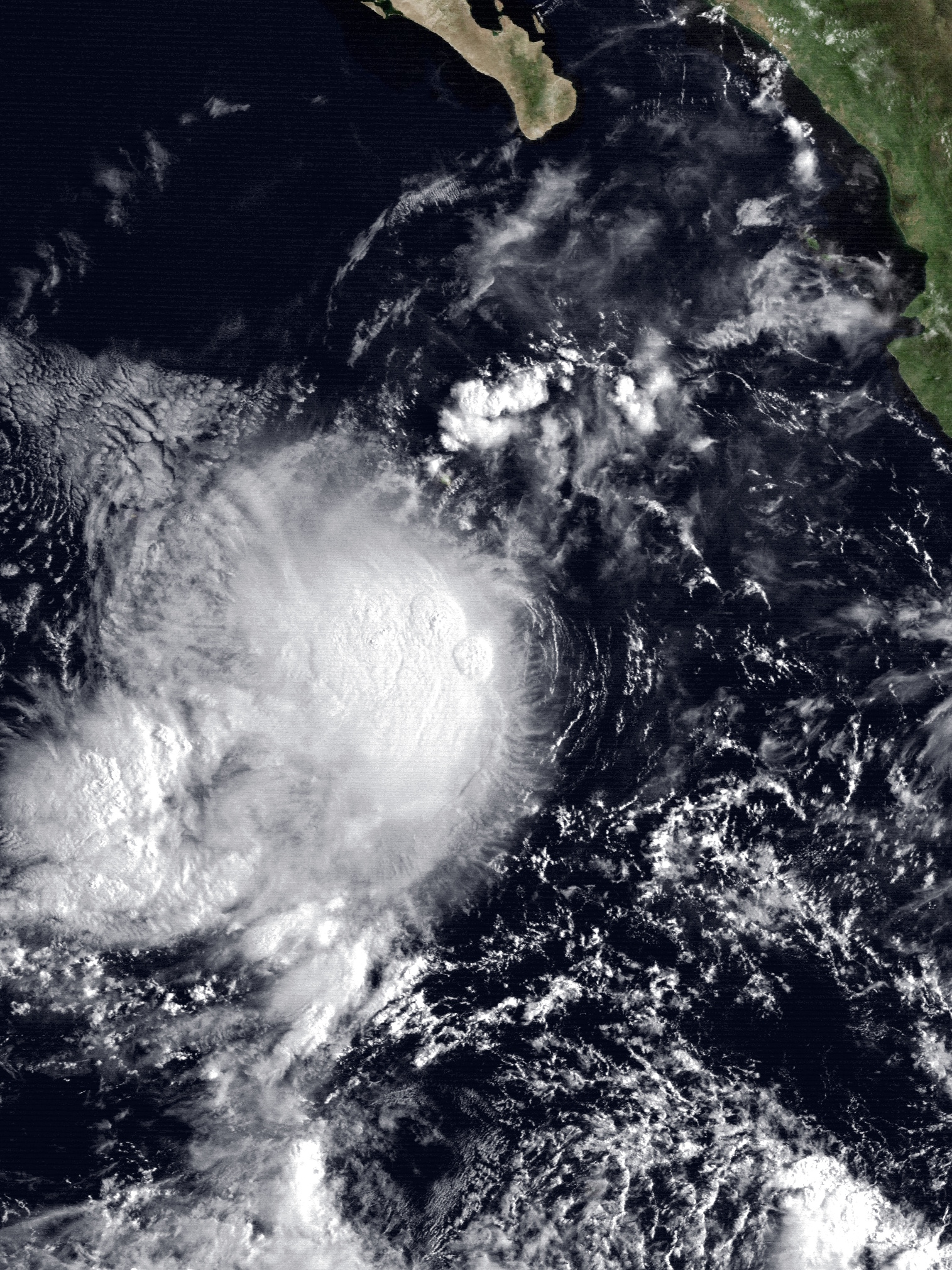
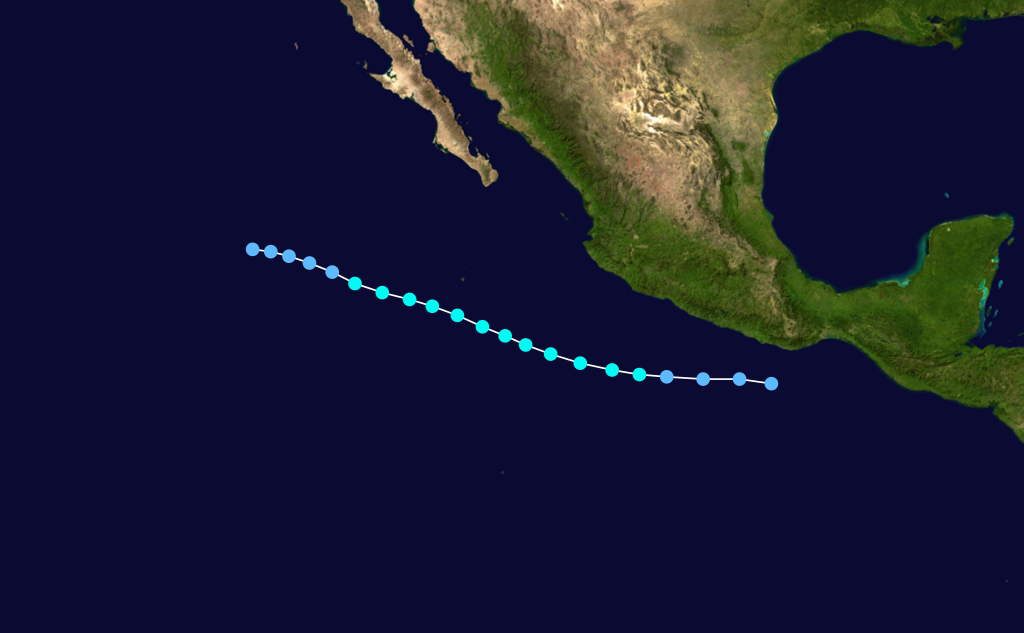
- Duration: September 3 – September 8
- Peak intensity: 50 mph (85 km/h) (1-min); 1000 mbar (hPa)

On September 2, a tropical wave began showing signs of organization, and on September 3, it organized into a tropical depression. Upon becoming a tropical cyclone, Narda was located over warm sea surface temperatures. Moving rapidly, to the west-northwest, Narda strengthened into a tropical storm. Strong wind shear prevented significant intensification beyond minimal tropical storm strength, with winds peaking at 50 mph (75 km/h). Initially, Narda managed to produce brief burst of convection. By September 7, however, Narda was devoid of convection, and was respectively downgraded to a tropical depression. It never impacted land.

=== Hurricane Octave ===
- Category 4 hurricane (SSHWS)
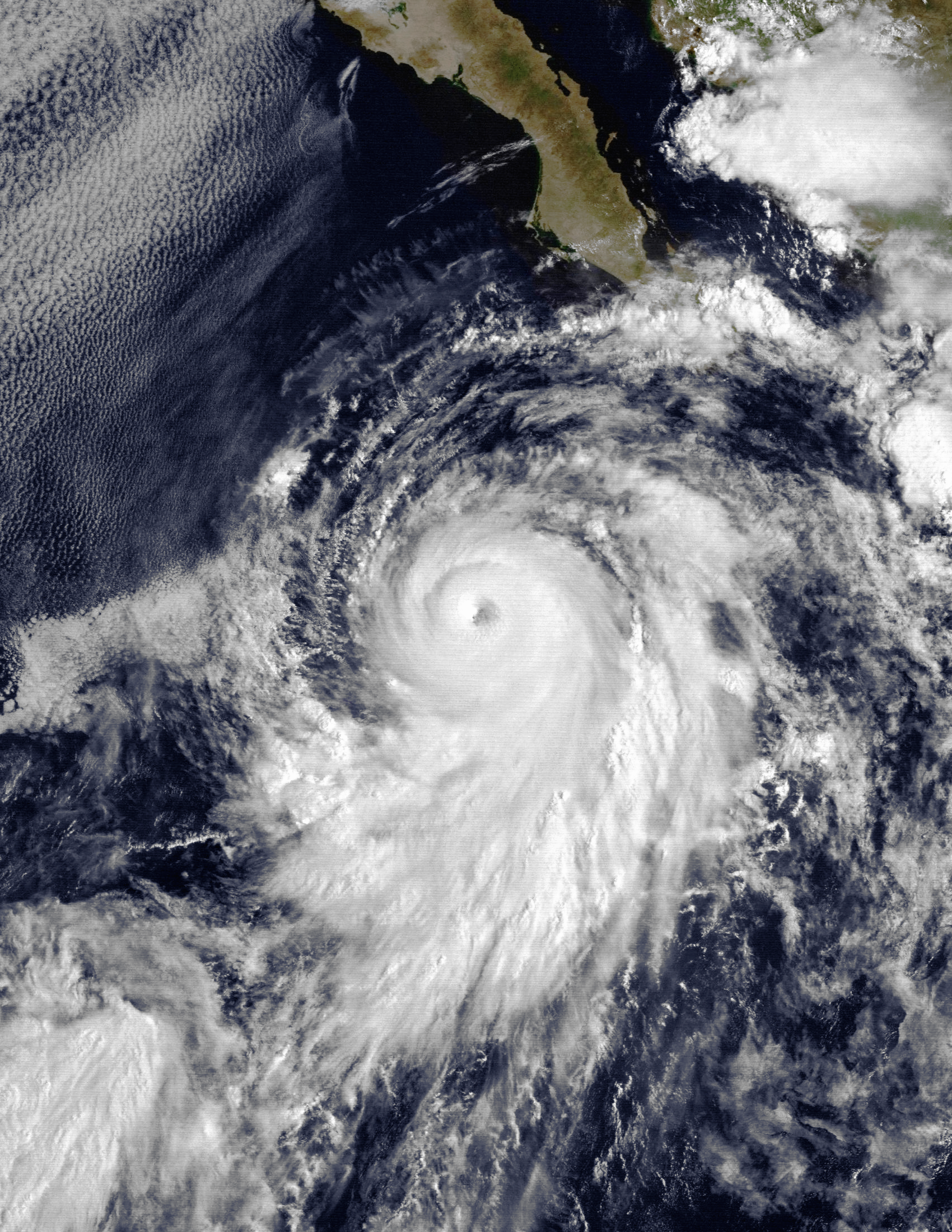
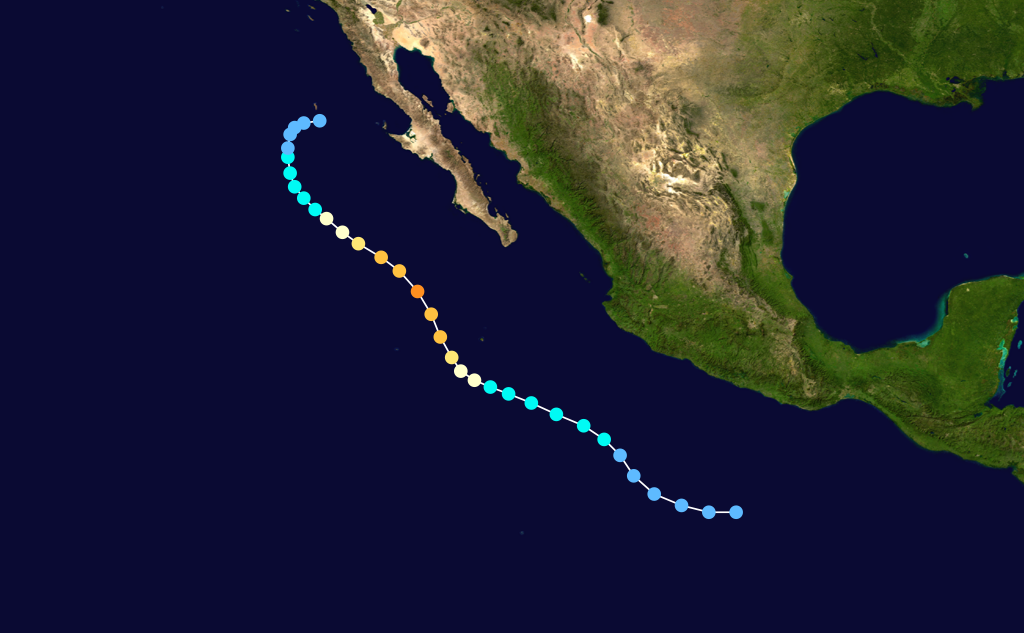
- Duration: September 8 – September 16
- Peak intensity: 130 mph (215 km/h) (1-min); 948 mbar (hPa)

A tropical wave left the west coast of Africa on August 21. Moving westward, the wave briefly developed into Tropical Depression Nine on August 27, only to degenerate back to a tropical wave a day later due to strong wind shear. The wave later crossed Central America into the eastern Pacific on September 3. After remaining stationary for several days, the system developed into Tropical Depression 18-E on September 8 about 400 mi (640 km) south of the Mexican coastline, after its convection became well-organized. The system tracked northwestward, steered by an anticyclone over Mexico and a trough to the west. The depression intensified into Tropical Storm Octave on September 10, by which time wind shear had decreased. The storm later developed outflow and eventually an eye, signaling that Octave attained hurricane status late on September 11. During the afternoon of September 13, Octave intensified into a major hurricane, and early the next day it reached a peak intensity of 135 mph (215 km/h), making it a Category 4 hurricane, based on estimates from the Dvorak technique. Around its peak, Octave had a minimum pressure of 948 mbar (28.0 inHg). Soon thereafter, the hurricane encountered cooler water temperatures, which caused a steady weakening trend. By September 14, Octave weakened to tropical storm status, and the next day it was downgraded to a tropical depression. After turning back towards the east, Octave rapidly dissipated on September 16 as steering current diminished.

Octave came within 200 mi (320 km) of Mexico's Socorro Island, which recorded winds of 35 mph (56 km/h). Moisture from the storm spread into southern California. In the Sacramento Valley, the city of Redding recorded 2.21 in (56 mm) of rain in a 12-hour span and 3.15 in (80 mm) in 24 hours. Sacramento also recorded 1.56 in (40 mm) in 6 hours. Light rainfall was reported throughout southern California, with enough falling in Los Angeles to make streets slippery. Moisture associated with Octave produced isolated showers in thunderstorms in parts of southern Arizona on September 16. In addition, a power outage in Lodi, California affected 7,000 customers. Octave also produced minor damage to the grape and raisin crops.

=== Tropical Storm Priscilla ===
- Tropical storm (SSHWS)
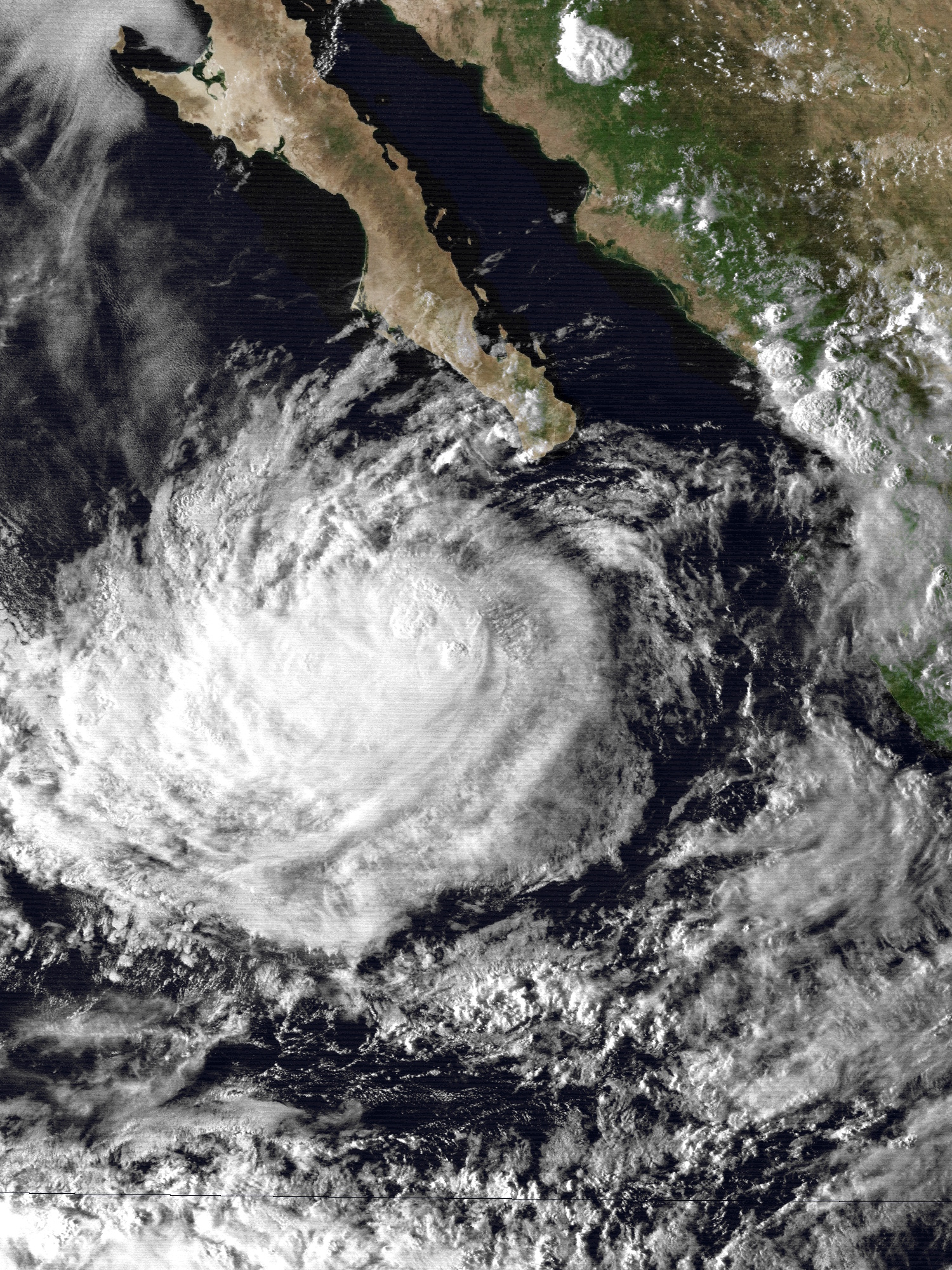
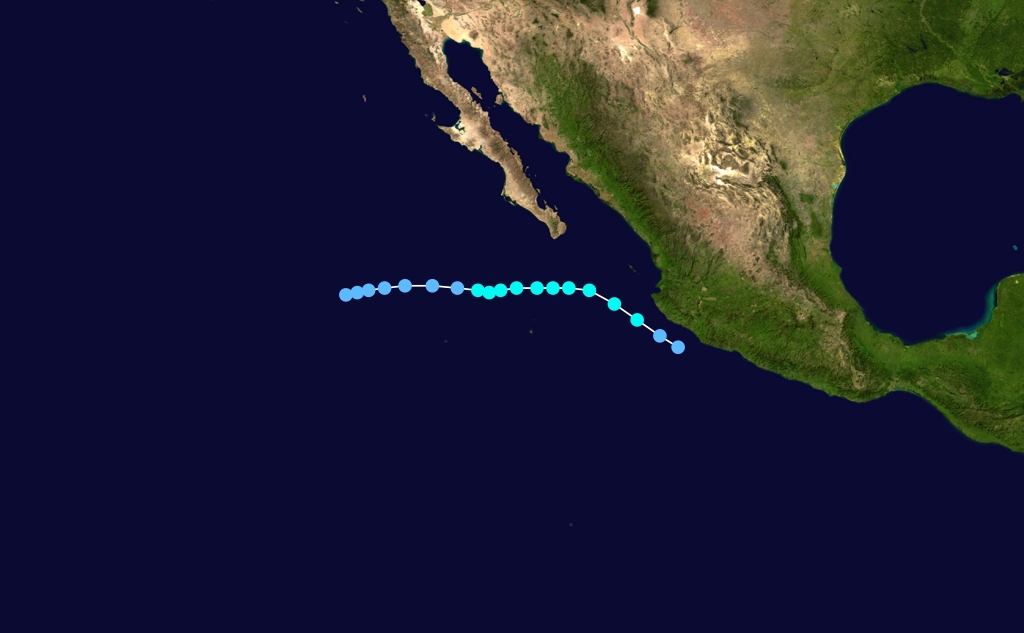
- Duration: September 21 – September 25
- Peak intensity: 65 mph (100 km/h) (1-min); 993 mbar (hPa)

Tropical Depression Nineteen-E organized from an area of low pressure on September 21. Upon being upgraded, the depression was anticipated to slowly strengthen, becoming a strong tropical storm in three days. Moving northwestward, it was named Priscilla the next day. Continuing to intensify, it reached its peak intensity of 65 mph (100 km/h). Due to its close proximity to the cooler waters, Priscilla began weakening almost immediately thereafter. The cyclone weakened into a tropical depression on September 24 and dissipated the next day .

Although Priscilla did not directly impact land as a tropical cyclone, the remnant moisture enhanced a non-tropical low off the California coastline, resulting in heavy rainfall along the Pacific coast of the United States. In southern California, the system also resulted in hot and humid weather, with some areas reaching up to 108 °F (42 °C).

=== Tropical Depression Twenty-E ===
- Tropical depression (SSHWS)
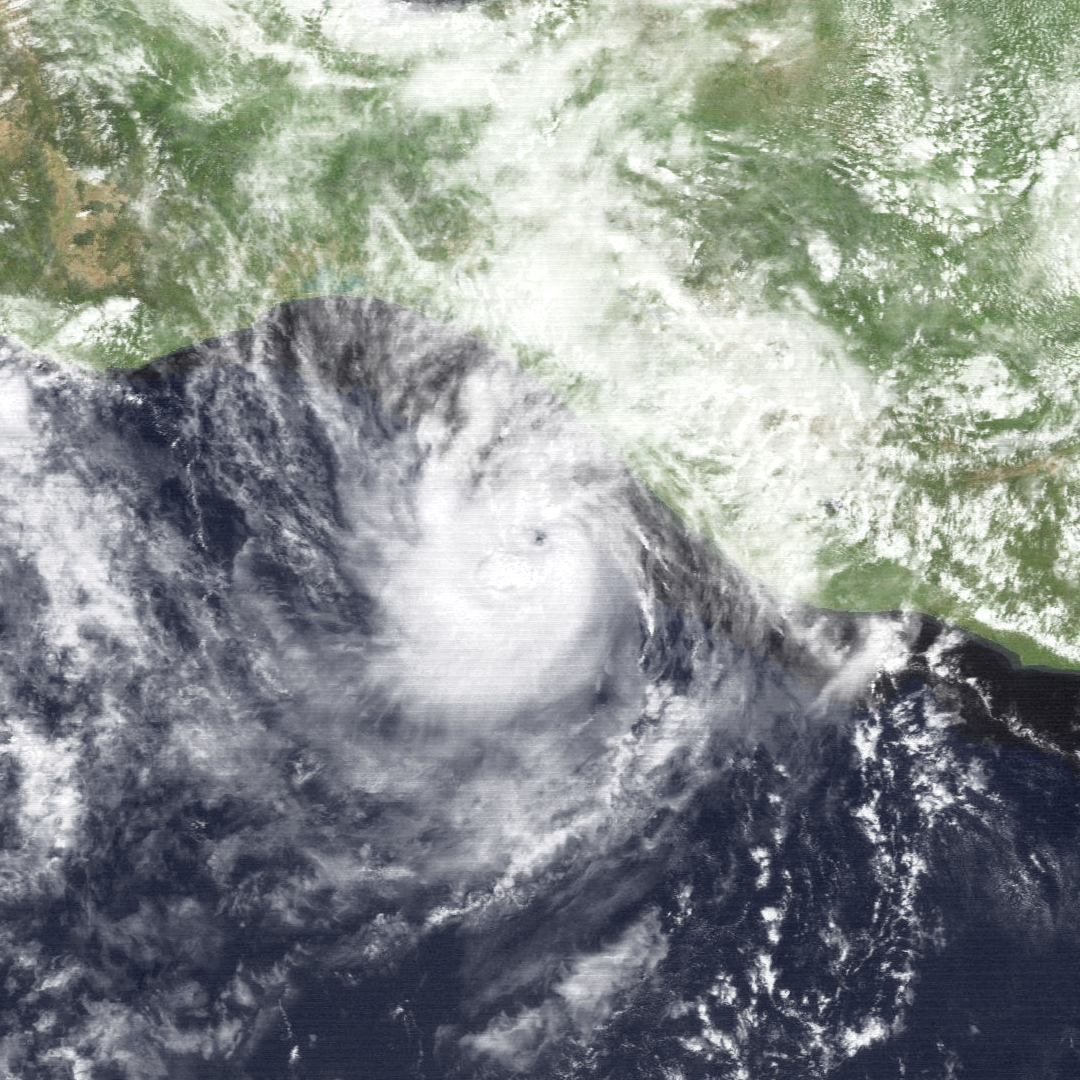
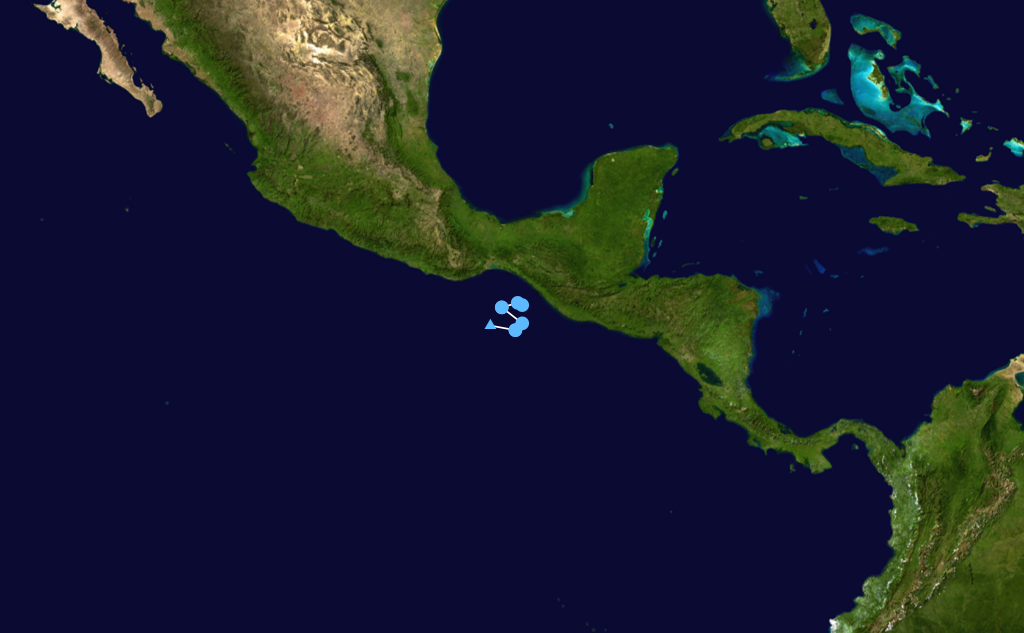
- Duration: September 25 – September 27
- Peak intensity: 35 mph (55 km/h) (1-min);

On September 24, Tropical Depression Twenty-E formed southwest of Guatemala. Although convection increased, significant development was not anticipated due to its proximity to land. It was also forecasted to make landfall in 36 hours. A small cyclone, its close distance to Hurricane Raymond hindered development. Moving very little, the winds soon diminished. The depression dissipated on September 27. When the depression was anticipated to make landfall in Mexico. As such, the NHC noted the possibility of heavy rains especially over the higher elevations. However, no impact was reported from the tropical cyclone.

=== Hurricane Raymond ===
- Category 4 hurricane (SSHWS)
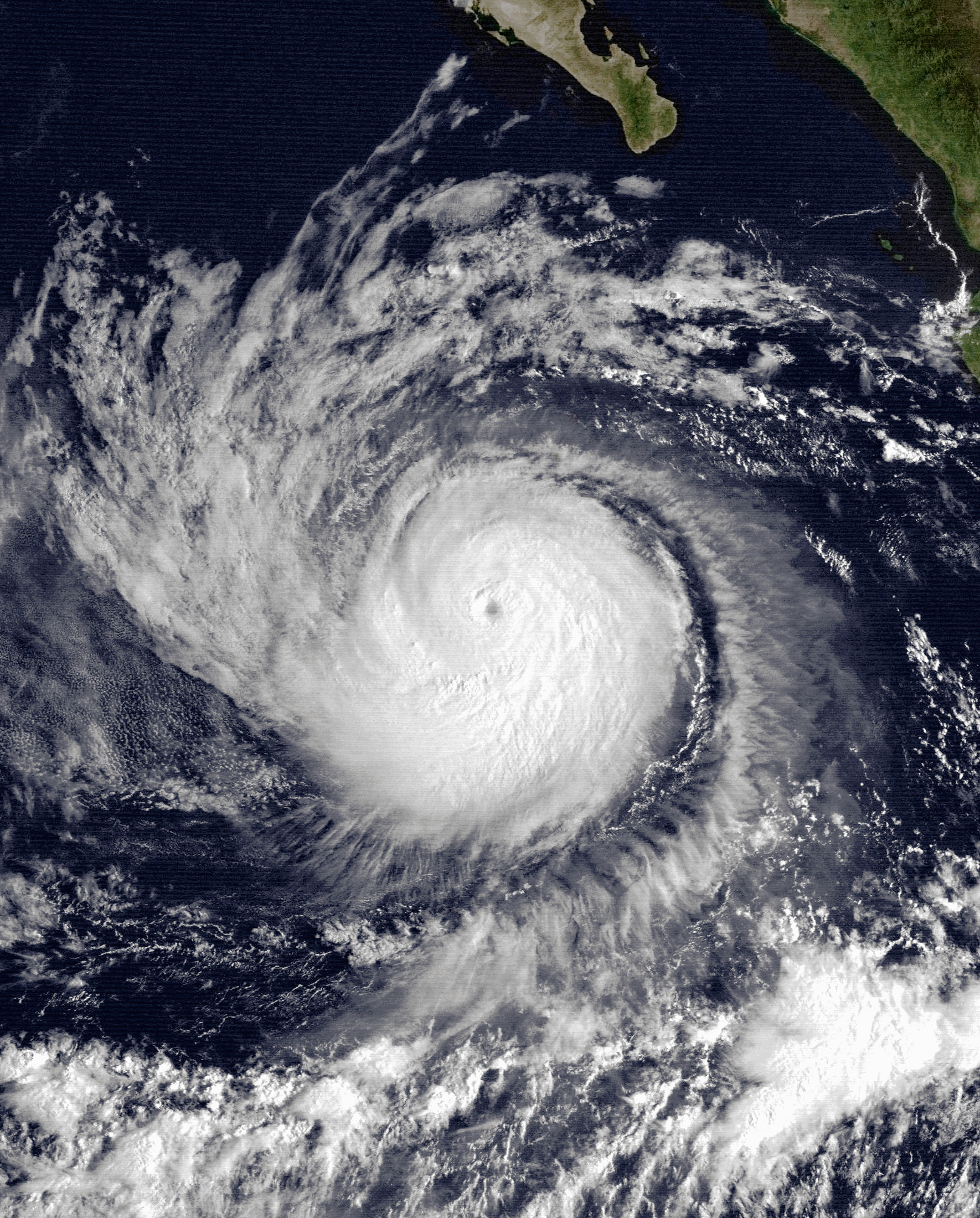
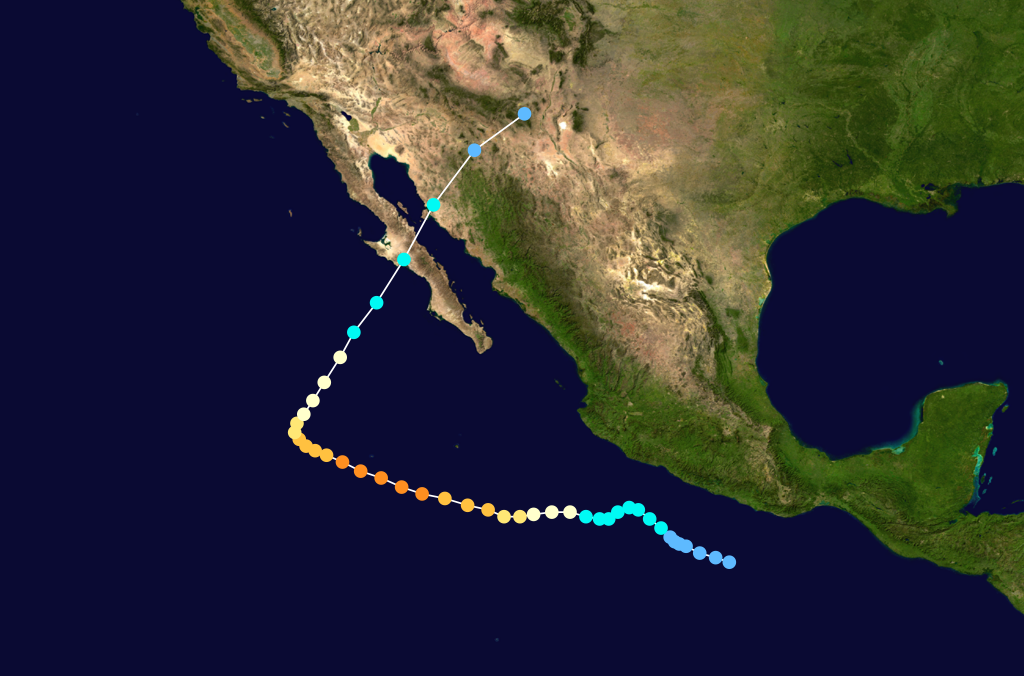
- Duration: September 25 – October 5
- Peak intensity: 145 mph (230 km/h) (1-min); 935 mbar (hPa)

Tropical Depression Twenty One-E formed from part of the same tropical wave that had earlier spawned Hurricane Hugo. Moving slowly to the west-northwest, it accelerated to the northwest in response to a trough and strengthened into the seventeenth named storm of the season on September 26. Raymond turned to the west again and entered a favourable environment. Raymond eventually peaked as a Category 4 hurricane and the strongest storm of the season on October 1. A trough over Mexico destroyed the ridge that was steering Raymond and recurved the cyclone to the northeast. The hurricane accelerated into a less favorable environment, and slowly weakened as its forward speed increased to 23 mph (37 km/h). Raymond made landfall as a tropical storm on October 4. Northern Mexico's mountains disrupted Raymond's circulation, and dissipated over New Mexico on October 5 after passing over that state and Arizona as a depression.

Since Raymond had significantly weakened prior to its first landfall, only minor impacts were recorded in Mexico. The highest rainfall was recorded in Nogales at 4.72 in (120 mm). In the city, the swollen Santa Cruz River destroyed a heavily traveled bridge, known as the Calle Obregon, and destroyed a store which was situated on the banks of the river. Mexican officials estimated damages at $250,000 (1989 USD, $649,329 2026 USD). The remnants of the storm tracked into the Southwest United States and further into the Central United States before dissipating. Rainfall in excess of 3 in (76 mm) fell in parts of southern Arizona; the highest total was recorded in Independence, Kansas, at 3.91 in (99 mm). One person was killed in a mobile home which was destroyed by high winds. Flash flooding triggered by Raymond caused an estimated $1.5 million (1989 USD, $3.9 million 2026 USD) in damages in Arizona.

=== Tropical Depression Twenty Two-E ===
- Tropical depression (SSHWS)
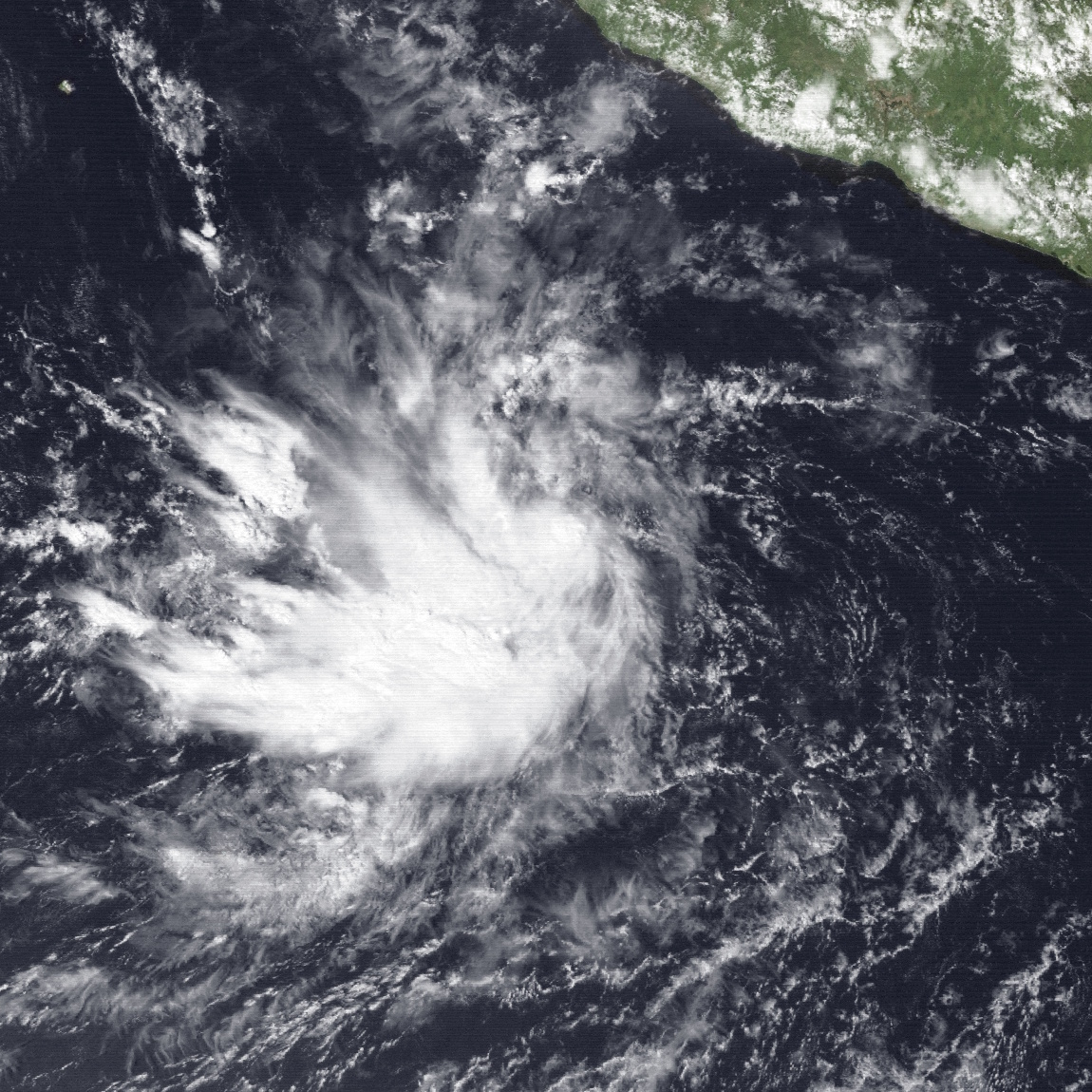
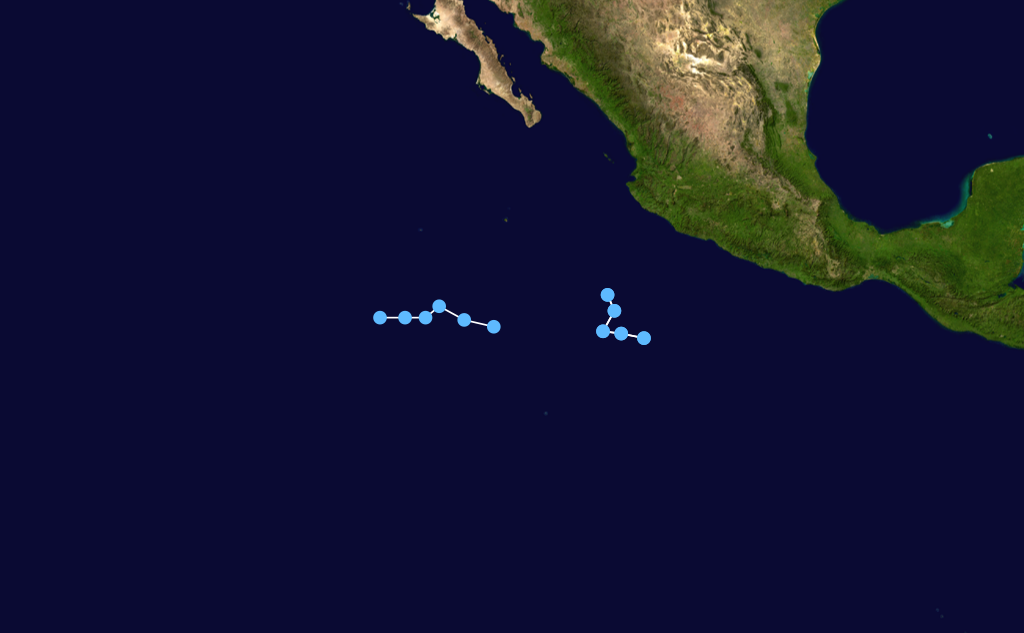
- Duration: October 3 – October 8
- Peak intensity: 35 mph (55 km/h) (1-min);

On October 3, a tropical depression formed 475 mi (764 km) south of Mexico from an area of disturbed weather that had become better organized. Upon becoming a tropical cyclone, the cyclone was located in a favorable environment. As such, it was forecasted to reach a peak intensity of 70 mph (110 km/h) to be named "Sonia". Later that day, convection increased, but the NHC did not upgrade the system into a tropical storm. However, increased wind shear quickly caused the system to become exposed. After drifting westbound, it did not become a tropical storm and dissipated on October 4. However, it regenerated on October 7 as deep convection had developed near the center for about 12 hours. Upon regenerating, it was forecasted to intensify into a strong tropical storm as it was expected to turn to the north. Shortly thereafter, the system became less organized; it dissipated again the next day. The depression never threatened land.

=== Tropical Depression Twenty Three-E ===
- Tropical depression (SSHWS)
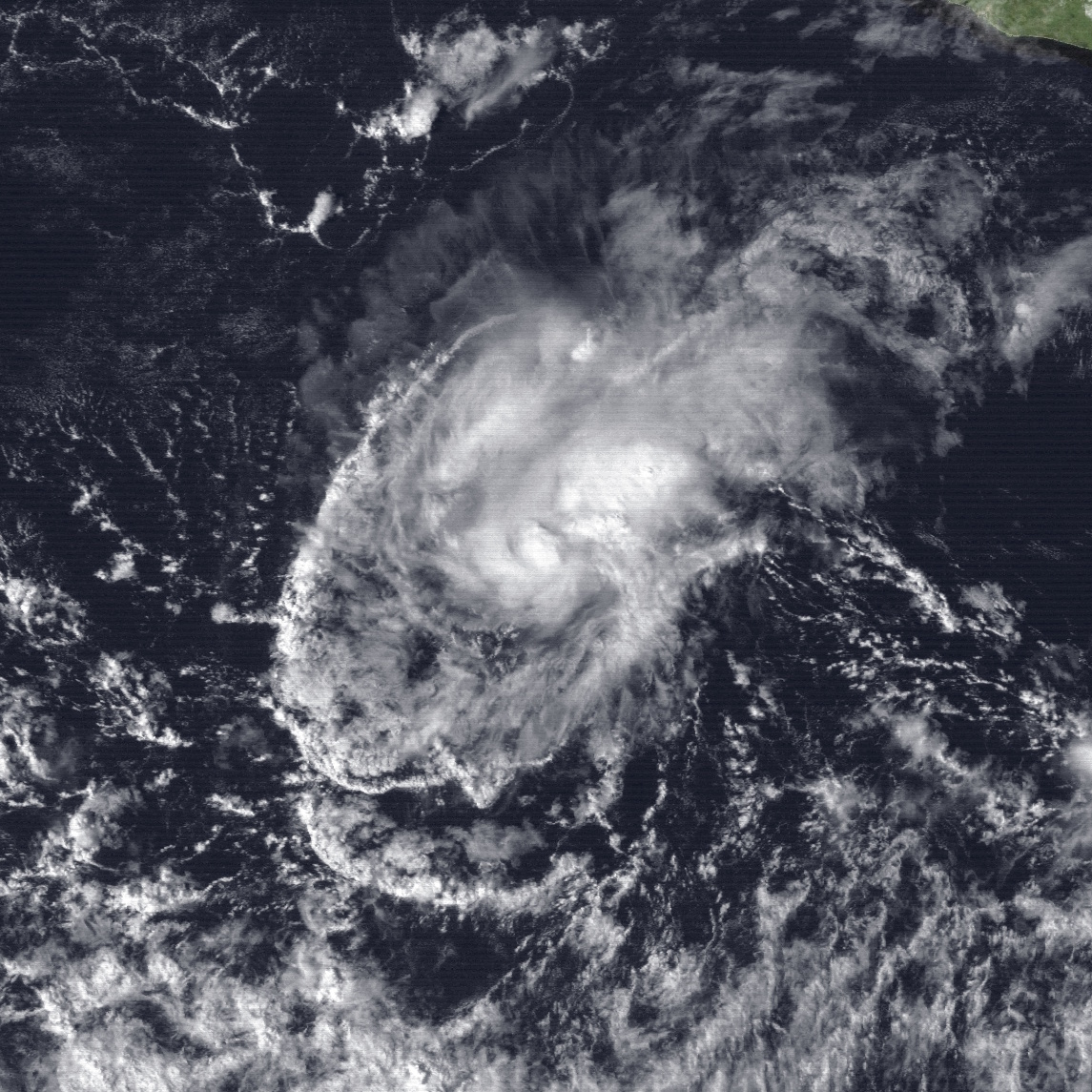
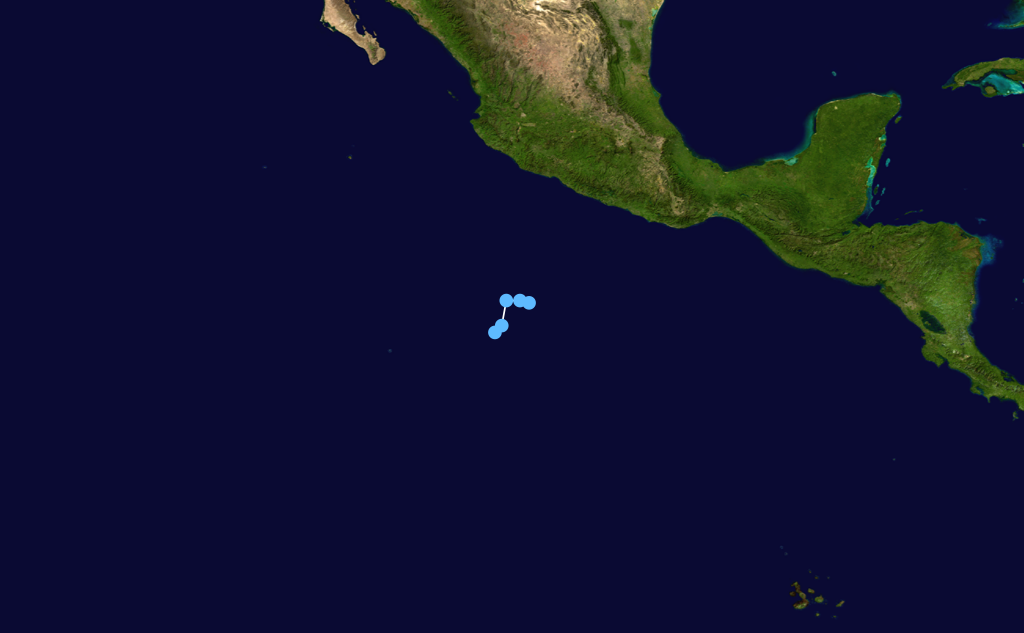
- Duration: October 15 – October 17
- Peak intensity: 35 mph (55 km/h) (1-min);

On October 15, Tropical Depression 23E developed about 550 mi (890 km) to the southwest of Mexico City, within an area of warm water and diminishing wind shear and as a result was expected to slowly intensify further. However, during October 16, all of the deep convection associated with 23E dissipated, before the National Hurricane Center issued its final advisory during the next day.

=== Tropical Depression Twenty Four-E ===
- Tropical depression (SSHWS)
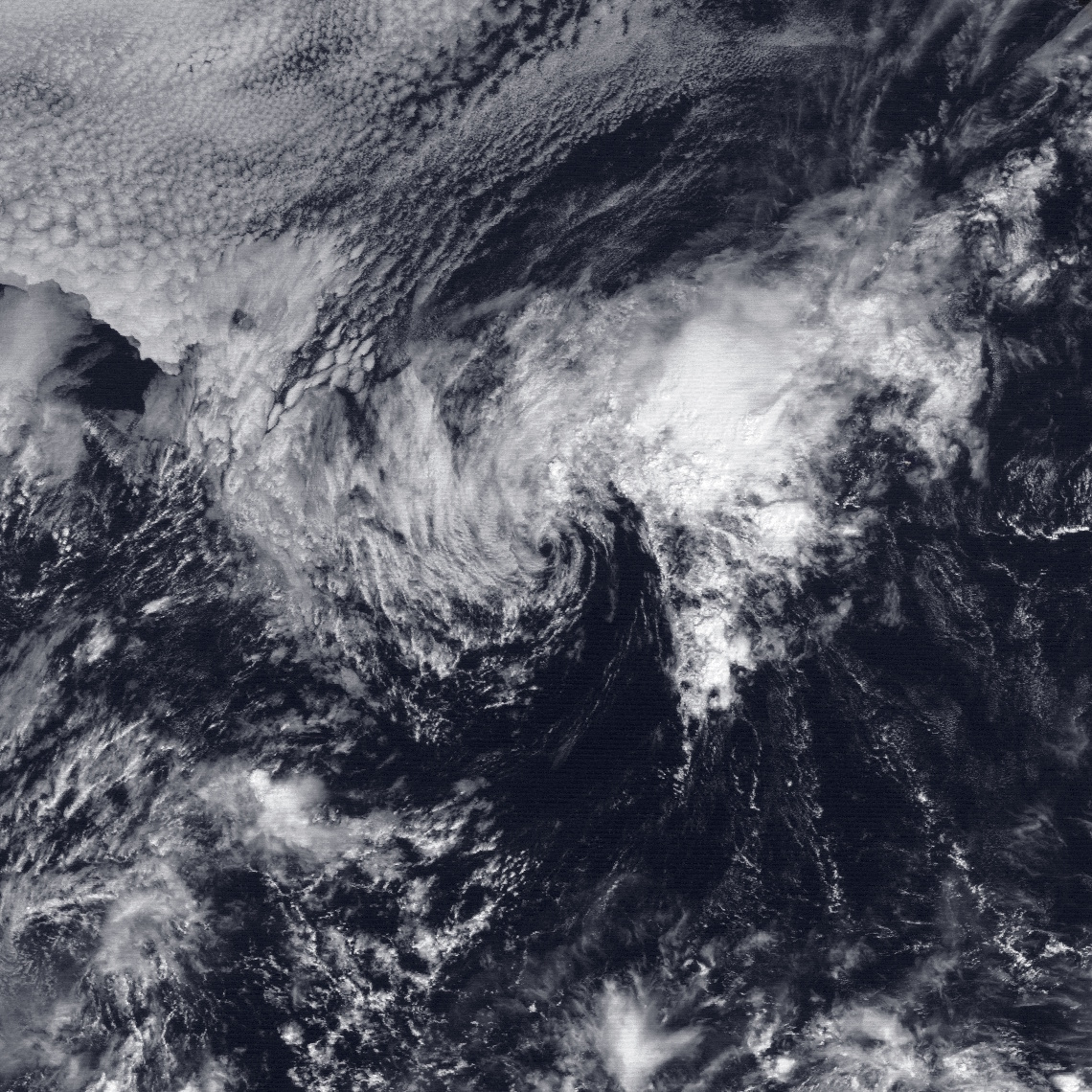
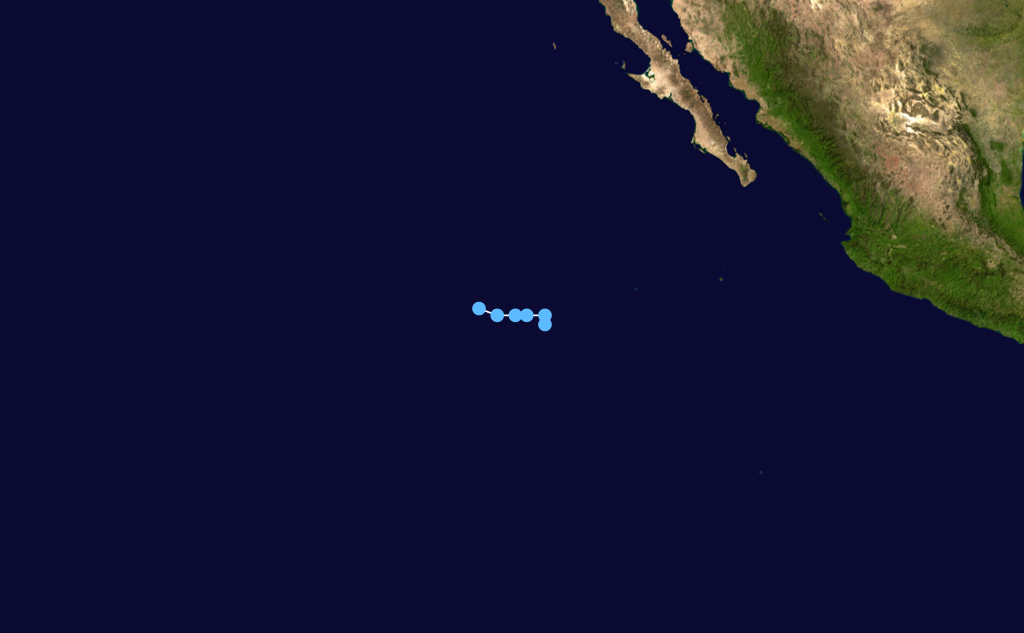
- Duration: October 18 – October 19
- Peak intensity: 35 mph (55 km/h) (1-min);

On October 18, the NHC began issuing advisories on Tropical Depression Twenty Four-E. Although the depression was located within an area of high wind shear, convection had managed to partially develop around the center of circulation. A ship nearby the system reported sustained winds of 40 mph (65 km/h); however, the winds were not considered to be representative of the actual intensity of the depression. Further intensification was not expected as the depression tracked in a northward direction Shortly after the first advisory was issued, convection rapidly dissipated, leaving an exposed low-pressure area, devoid of shower and thunderstorm activity. The system was forecast to dissipate within 36 hours due to high shear. Late on October 18, the forward motion of the depression abruptly changed towards the west. The final advisory on Tropical Depression Twenty Four-E was issued during the afternoon of October 19 as the system remained devoid of convection; redevelopment of the system was not anticipated due to unfavorable conditions.

== Storm names ==
The following list of names was used for named storms that formed in the North Pacific Ocean east of 140°W in 1989. This is essentially the same list used for the 1983 season, though the rotating lists went only to the "W" name at the time. It would be used next, with two modifications, for the 1995 season. No names were retired from the list following the 1989 season, but Winnie was later interchanged with Wallis, and Dalilia was respelled as "Dalila" for 1995.

- Adolph
- Barbara
- Cosme
- Dalilia *
- Erick
- Flossie
- Gil
- Henriette
- Ismael *
- Juliette
- Kiko
- Lorena
- Manuel
- Narda
- Octave
- Priscilla
- Raymond
- Sonia (unused)
- Tico (unused)
- Velma (unused)
- Winnie (unused)
- Xina (unused)
- York (unused)
- Zelda (unused)

For storms that form in the North Pacific from 140°W to the International Date Line, the names come from a series of four rotating lists. Names are used one after the other without regard to year, and when the bottom of one list is reached, the next named storm receives the name at the top of the next list. One storm, later named Winona, formed in the Central Pacific basin in 1989; it was operationally named after crossing into the Western Pacific by the Joint Typhoon Warning Center. Named storms in the table above that crossed into the area during the year are noted (*).

== Season effects ==
This is a table of all of the tropical cyclones that formed in the 1989 Pacific hurricane season. It includes their name, duration (within the basin), peak classification and intensities, areas affected, damage, and death totals. Deaths in parentheses are additional and indirect (an example of an indirect death would be a traffic accident), but were still related to that storm. Damage and deaths include totals while the storm was extratropical, a wave, or a low, and all of the damage figures are in 1989 USD.

Saffir–Simpson scale
TD	TS	C1	C2	C3	C4	C5

1989 Pacific tropical cyclone season statistics
Storm name	Dates active	Storm category at peak intensity	Max 1-min wind mph (km/h)	Min. press. (mbar)	Areas affected	Damage (US$)	Deaths	Ref(s).
Winona	January 9 – 15	Tropical storm	45 (75)	1012	None (before crossover)	None	None	
Adolph	May 31 – June 5	Tropical storm	65 (100)	994	None	None	None	
Barbara	June 15–21	Category 1 hurricane	80 (130)	984	None	None	None	
Cosme	June 19–23	Category 1 hurricane	85 (140)	979	Guerrero	Unknown	30	
Four-E	July 9–14	Tropical depression	35 (55)	Unknown	None	None	None	
Five-E	July 10–16	Tropical depression	35 (55)	Unknown	None	None	None	
Dalilia	July 11–21	Category 1 hurricane	90 (150)	977	Hawaii	Minimal	None	
Seven-E	July 16–18	Tropical depression	35 (55)	Unknown	None	None	None	
Erick	July -9–21	Tropical storm	40 (65)	1005	None	None	None	
Flossie	July 23–28	Tropical storm	40 (65)	1004	None	None	None	
Gil	July 30 – August 5	Category 1 hurricane	85 (140)	979	None	None	None	
Ismael	August 14–25	Category 3 hurricane	120 (195)	955	Guerrero, Colima	None	3	
Henriette	August 15–17	Tropical storm	50 (85)	1000	None	None	None	
Juliette	August 21–25	Tropical storm	65 (100)	992	None	None	None	
Kiko	August 25–29	Category 3 hurricane	120 (195)	955	Baja California Sur, Western Mexico	Minimal	None	
Lorena	August 27 – September 6	Category 1 hurricane	75 (120)	989	None	None	None	
Manuel	August 28–31	Tropical storm	45 (75)	1002	None	None	None	
Narda	September 3–8	Tropical storm	50 (85)	1000	None	None	None	
Octave	September 8–16	Category 4 hurricane	130 (215)	948	Socorro Island, Southwestern United States	Minimal	None	
Priscilla	September 21–25	Tropical storm	65 (100)	993	None	None	None	
Twenty-E	September 25–27	Tropical depression	35 (55)	Unknown	None	None	None	
Raymond	September 25 – October 5	Category 4 hurricane	145 (230)	935	Baja California Peninsula, Sonora, Arizona	$1.75 million	1	
Twenty Two-E	October 3–8	Tropical depression	35 (55)	Unknown	None	None	None	
Twenty Three-E	October 15–17	Tropical depression	35 (55)	Unknown	None	None	None	
Twenty Four-E	October 18–19	Tropical depression	35 (55)	Unknown	None	None	None	
Season aggregates
25 systems	May 31 – October 19		145 (230)	935		>1.75 million	34	

== See also ==
- List of Pacific hurricanes
- Pacific hurricane season
- 1989 Atlantic hurricane season
- 1989 Pacific typhoon season
- 1989 North Indian Ocean cyclone season
- South-West Indian Ocean cyclone seasons: 1988–89, 1989–90
- Australian region cyclone seasons: 1988–89, 1989–90
- South Pacific cyclone seasons: 1988–89, 1989–90
