= Hurricane Chantal (1989) =

Category 1 Atlantic hurricane in 1989

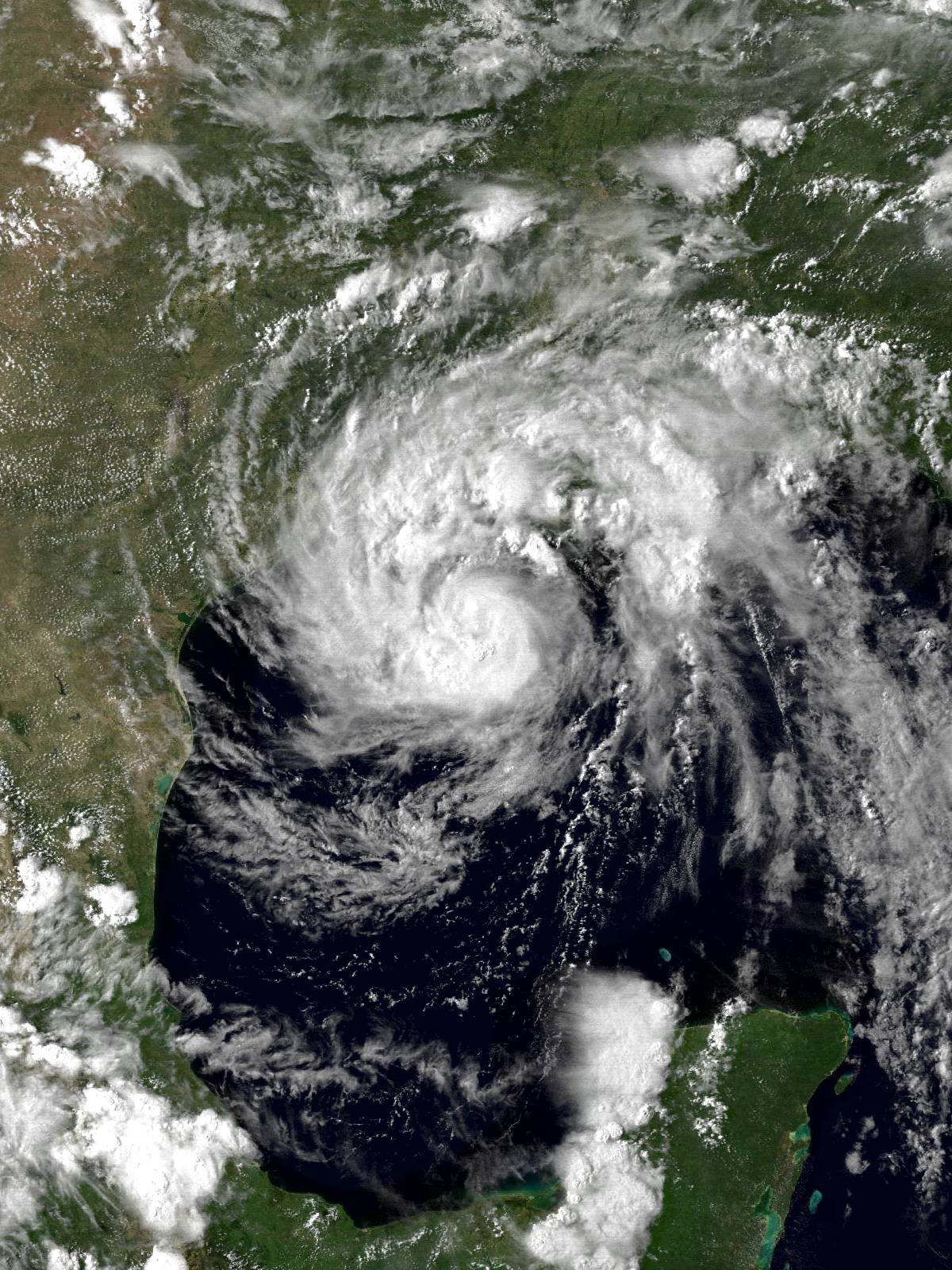
- Chantal near peak intensity south of the Texas coast on July 31

Meteorological history
- Formed: July 30, 1989
- Dissipated: August 3, 1989

Category 1 hurricane
- 1-minute sustained (SSHWS/NWS)
- Highest winds: 80 mph (130 km/h)
- Lowest pressure: 984 mbar (hPa); 29.06 inHg

Overall effects
- Fatalities: 13 direct
- Damage: $100 million (1989 USD)
- Areas affected: Texas, Louisiana, Oklahoma, Midwestern United States
- IBTrACS
- Part of the 1989 Atlantic hurricane season

Hurricane Chantal (/ʃɑːnˈtɑːl/ shahn-TAHL) was one of three tropical cyclones to make landfall in Texas during the 1989 Atlantic hurricane season. The third named storm and the first hurricane of the season, Chantal slowly developed on July 30 in the southern Gulf of Mexico from a tropical disturbance that was previously within Intertropical Convergence Zone (ITCZ) while near Trinidad and Tobago. While heading north-northwestward, the depression steadily intensified and was upgraded to Tropical Storm Chantal on the following day. Thereafter, Chantal quickly strengthen and became a hurricane on August 1. After intensifying slightly further, Chantal made landfall near High Island, Texas later that day. The storm quickly weakened upon moving inland and fell to tropical storm intensity a few hours after landfall. Early on August 2, Chantal weakened to a tropical depression and dissipated over Oklahoma by August 4.

While making landfall in Texas, the storm produced relatively small tides, with most locations reporting waves less than 4 feet (1.2 m) in height. However, some locations experienced extensive beach erosion. In addition, there were numerous rescues made by the U.S. Coast Guard. Due to both rainfall and high winds at least 3,000 homes were damaged, and numerous trees and sign were knocked down. Two tornadoes were reported, with one causing the destruction of a shed in Crystal Beach, Texas, and the other knocking over several trees and mobile homes in Iota, Louisiana. Elsewhere, Chantal and its remnants brought light to moderate rainfall to several other states, although affects were minor in other states. Overall, 13 fatalities occurred, all of which due to drowning, and at least $100 million (1989 USD, $259.6 million 2026 USD) in damage was reported.

== Meteorological history ==
Map plotting the storm's track and intensity, according to the Saffir–Simpson scale Map key Saffir–Simpson scale Tropical depression (≤38 mph, ≤62 km/h) Tropical storm (39–73 mph, 63–118 km/h) Category 1 (74–95 mph, 119–153 km/h) Category 2 (96–110 mph, 154–177 km/h) Category 3 (111–129 mph, 178–208 km/h) Category 4 (130–156 mph, 209–251 km/h) Category 5 (≥157 mph, ≥252 km/h) Unknown Storm type Tropical cyclone Subtropical cyclone Extratropical cyclone, remnant low, tropical disturbance, or monsoon depression

The origins of Hurricane Chantal can be tracked back to a tropical disturbance within the Intertropical Convergence Zone near Trinidad and Tobago on July 24. The system crossed westward over the Caribbean Sea, and there were no signs of organization until July 27 near the coast of Honduras. Despite the predictions for slow development from the tropical weather outlooks, it was possible that the system developed a surface low center near Belize City, Belize late on July 28. After the system moved inland over the Yucatán Peninsula, it became disorganized, although the National Hurricane Center indicated in the tropical weather outlook that once it moved into the Gulf of Mexico there was potential for development. Although the outflow of the system had appeared impressive on satellite images, the potential for development seemed uncertain, mostly due to the close proximity to land. The storm quickly became better organized based on satellite data and ship reports.

Tropical Storm Chantal on July 31

Almost immediately after emerging into the Gulf of Mexico on July 30, the cloud pattern of system quickly became better organized. Later after emerging into the Gulf of Mexico, ships and satellite images confirmed that Tropical Depression Four had formed offshore of the north coast of the Yucatán Peninsula; although it was likely that the depression formed 80 miles (130 km) north of the Yucatán Peninsula several hours earlier than confirmed. The following morning after development occurred, the depression had intensified into a tropical storm 575 miles (925 km) southeast of Texas; the National Hurricane Center assigned it to the name Chantal. Although it became a tropical storm early that morning, the system was not upgraded to a tropical storm until a reconnaissance flight confirmed tropical storm force winds about six hours later, when sustained winds were already 50 mph (80 km/h). Tropical Storm Chantal rapidly strengthened thereafter, with weather satellites indicating t–numbers increasing from 2.5 to 3.5 within twelve hours using the Dvorak technique. Chantal continued to intensify, and headed northwestward at 11 mph (18 km/h) due to weak ridging over Florida.

Later on July 31, satellite imagery revealed better organization, and another reconnaissance flight found winds at 91 mph (146 km/h) while flying at 1,500 feet (460 m). Based on these observations, it was estimated that Chantal had intensified into a hurricane early on August 1. Hurricane Chantal continued to intensify, slightly, and attained its peak intensity on August 1 at 1000 UTC, reaching maximum sustained winds of 80 mph (130 km/h) and a minimum barometric pressure of 986 mbar (29.1 inHg). Only three hours thereafter, Hurricane Chantal made landfall near High Island, Texas with winds still at 80 mph (130 km/h). Chantal rapidly weakened to a tropical storm at 1800 UTC on August 2, just five hours after landfall, and quickly degenerated to a tropical depression early on August 2. Tropical Depression continued its course and eventually dissipated over western Oklahoma on August 3. The remnants of Chantal then moved northward over the Great Plains and was tracked northward over New York, eventually reaching New England and Newfoundland just before Hurricane Dean approached.

== Preparations ==
At 0000 UTC on July 31, a tropical storm watch – indicating tropical storm force winds were possible within 48 hours – was issued from Port O'Connor, Texas to the mouth of the Mississippi River. Three hours thereafter, a hurricane warning – signifying that hurricane-force winds were likely in 24 hours or less – was issued from Freeport, Texas to Morgan City, Louisiana. A tropical storm warning was simultaneously put into effect from Port O'Connor, Texas to Mobile, Alabama, significantly overlapping the existing hurricane warning. The tropical storm warning was discontinued at 1000 UTC on August 1. Six hours later, the hurricane warning issued at 0300 UTC on July 31 was downgraded to a tropical storm warning, before the portion from Port Arthur, Texas to Morgan City, Louisiana was canceled. The remaining portion from Freeport to Port O'Connor, Texas was discontinued at 0100 UTC on August 2.

In addition to the tropical cyclone watches and warnings, several other actions were taken as Chantal approached. More than 600 oil workers were moved inland, though a man drowned while attempting to evacuate a rig south of New Orleans, Louisiana. Mayor of Port Arthur Malcolm Grant asked 800 residents to evacuate Sabine Pass, due to potential coastal flooding isolating the area. Shelters were opened at various schools in Port Arthur and Beaumont. In nearby Orange, crews at emergency centers distributed sand bags. About 8,500 residents of Cameron Parish, Louisiana evacuated, with at least 67 people taking shelter at a school in Lake Charles. An additional 2,500 people fled Grand Isle, as the threat of the only road to the island flooding loomed.

== Impact ==
Texas bore the brunt of the storm, where strong winds and heavy rainfall damaged about 3,000 homes and knocked downed numerous trees and signs. Chantal also spawned two tornadoes, one in Crystal Beach, Texas and the other in Acadia Parish, Louisiana; both of which caused minor damage. Additionally, 13 fatalities occurred, all of them due to drowning; 11 deaths occurred offshore in the Gulf of Mexico, while the remaining two were reported in east-central Texas. Overall, the storm resulted in at least $100 million (1989 USD) in damage.

=== Mexico ===
Prior to becoming a tropical cyclone, the precursor tropical disturbance dropped rainfall on the Yucatán Peninsula of Mexico. The precipitation put out fires burning in the region, which had destroyed up to 370,000 acres (150,000 ha) of jungle in the two months prior to the tropical disturbance, according to the Agriculture Department of Mexico.

=== Texas ===
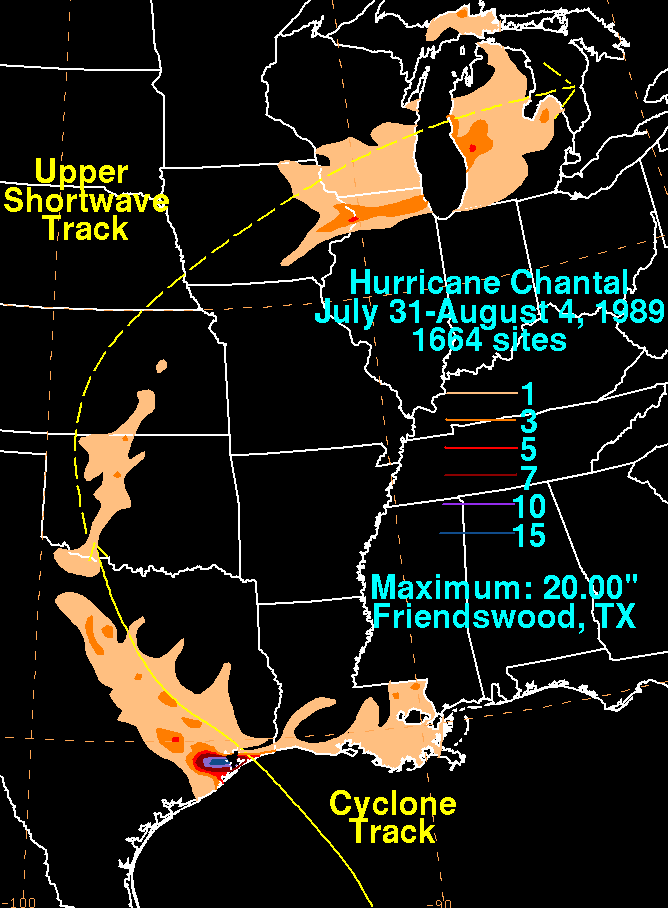
Rainfall totals in the United States associated with Hurricane Chantal

==== Galveston County ====
The worst effects from the storm occurred in Galveston County. Waves of 7 feet (2.1 m) in height were reported on High Island during Chantal, while Kemah measured tides of 3.8 feet (1.2 m), and the Galveston Flagship pier reported 3.5 feet (1.1 m) seas. The high tides eroded more than 1 mile (1.6 km) of Texas State Highway 87, while at least another 15 miles (24 km) of that highway was covered in sand and debris. As a result, the highway was expected to be closed for at least five weeks, though in October 1989, storm surge from Hurricane Jerry caused more erosion, and no repairs have been made since. In the northern portions of Galveston County, rainfall was generally at least 12 inches (300 mm), which a peak of 20 inches (510 mm) in Friendswood. Numerous streets in League City, Dickinson, and Friendswood were flooded for more than 24 hours. At least 100 homes in Friendswood were flooded, while water entered 70% of houses in Dickinson. Severe street flooding and ponding occurred in Galveston, especially in the low-lying areas; some homes and businesses were damaged, as a result. Overall, 500 homes in the county were flooded.

Strong winds also effected the county, with the highest recorded sustained wind speed being 70 mph (110 km/h) in Galveston; the highest gust of 83 mph (134 km/h) was reported at the same location. At the National Weather Service Office in Downtown Galveston, sustained winds were 53 mph (85 km/h) and gusts reached 69 mph (111 km/h). Although winds were strong, associated losses was confined to roof damage at beach homes in Gilchrist and High Island. In addition to strong winds, heavy rainfall, and high tides, the storm also produced one tornado in the county. Rated as an F0 on the Fujita scale, the tornado was spawned in Crystal Beach, where it destroyed a boat shed; elsewhere, no damage occurred from this twister.

==== Harris County ====
Rainfall produced by Chantal in the city of Houston alone varied extensively, with 7.14 inches (181 mm) at William P. Hobby Airport after twenty-four hours, and only 1.21 inches (31 mm) at George Bush Intercontinental Airport (then known as Houston Intercontinental Airport) in the same time lapse. In the southern portions of Harris County, rainfall totaled ranged from 8 to 12 inches (200 to 300 mm). Significant amounts of precipitation resulted in flooding, which in turn, caused several hundred emergency crew rescues and damage to at least 500 homes. Strong winds also caused significant effects in the county. In La Porte, where winds gusted to 70 mph (110 km/h), 40 trees were toppled at a golf course, while a plane was flipped over at the La Porte Municipal Airport. The roof of a mobile home was torn off and a fence and a portable building was destroyed in Highlands. Winds damaged a red cross shelter in Pasadena and blew out several windows at a hospital in Baytown. Throughout the county, high winds destroyed 2 mobile homes and damaged 49 apartments and 24 businesses.

==== Elsewhere in Texas ====
Heavy rainfall affected Brazoria County, where precipitation amounts up to 12 inches (300 mm) were reported; this caused significant flooding, especially in Pearland and Manvel. During the height of the storm, the entire town of Manvel was inundated with water, causing flood damage to at least 100 homes. Additionally, high winds in combination with floods damaged about 500 homes throughout the county. In Chambers County high winds caused two injuries and tore roofing material off of homes and mobile homes; about 100 homes were effected in the area. 6 inches (150 mm) of rain fell in the southern portions of the county, causing minor flooding. Between 8 and 12 inches (200 and 300 mm) of precipitation was recorded in eastern Fort Bend County. In the city of Fresno, at least 60 homes were flooded and several families were evacuated. After 9.7 inches (250 mm) of rain fell in Richmond, local flooding occurred. Several mobile homes in the county also suffered wind damage.

In Brazos County, heavy rainfall caused street flooding in College Station. Precipitation in Collin County reached as high as 16 inches (410 mm) in Clear Lake, though no flood damage was reported. Additionally, two fatalities occurred when two teenage boys were riding a rubber raft, swept into a drainpipe, and subsequently drowned. The highest sustained wind speed recorded in Jefferson County was 54 mph (87 km/h) at Sea Rim State Park, while the strongest gust was 49 mph (79 km/h) at the Jack Brooks Regional Airport. Winds downed trees and limbs, while also causing minor roof damage. Tides at Sabine Pass were about 3.9 feet (1.2 m) about mean sea level; some beach erosion was reported near that location. In Liberty County, winds felled tree limbs, which damaged vehicles and portable buildings.

=== Elsewhere ===
One fatality was reported during an oil rig evacuation in the Gulf of Mexico. Ten other people perished when a lifeboat capsized south of Morgan City, Louisiana. Four others on the boat were rescued by the United States Coast Guard. In Louisiana, high tides were only reported at one location, with seas reaching about 4.2 feet (1.3 m) in Cameron. Winds in the state were also light, with the highest sustained wind speed being 29 mph (47 km/h) along the Lake Pontchartrain Causeway, while the strongest gust was approximately 42 mph (68 km/h) in New Orleans. Rainfall was mostly minimal throughout the state and mainly less than 3 inches (76 mm), while the highest total recorded as 3.84 inches (98 mm) in Amite City. A tornado touched down in Acadia Parish, where it downed trees and removed a mobile home from its foundation. The only known impact in Mississippi was tides of 2.6 feet (0.79 m) above mean sea level.

Further north in the Midwestern United States, impact was generally minor. Chantal and its remnants dropped mostly light rainfall in the states of Oklahoma, Missouri, Kansas, Iowa, Wisconsin, Illinois, Indiana, and Michigan. Only two of those states – Illinois and Michigan – recorded more than 4 inches (100 mm) of precipitation. In Illinois, rainfall in Chicago flooded numerous streets and basements; Lake Shore Drive and Edens Expressway were briefly closed, as a result. Outside Chicago, minor flooding also occurred along a few creeks and low-lying areas. The rainfall rate of 2 inches (51 mm) per hour in Grand Rapids, Michigan caused the release of about 40 million gallons of untreated sewage into the Grand River. Despite crossing through Ontario and New York, it is unknown if any impact occurred in those two locations. In Vermont, the remnants of Chantal dropped rainfall in excess of 6 inches (150 mm) along the Caledonia, Orange, and Washington county lines. Bridges were knocked down, cars and homes were swept away, and crops were destroyed in the resultant flash floods.

== See also ==
- Hurricane Humberto (2007)
- Hurricane Jerry (1989)
- Other storms of the same name
