= 1989 hurricane season =

1989 hurricane season may refer to:

- The 1989 Atlantic hurricane season
- The 1989 Pacific hurricane season
