= Hurricane Gabrielle (1989) =

Category 4 Atlantic hurricane in 1989

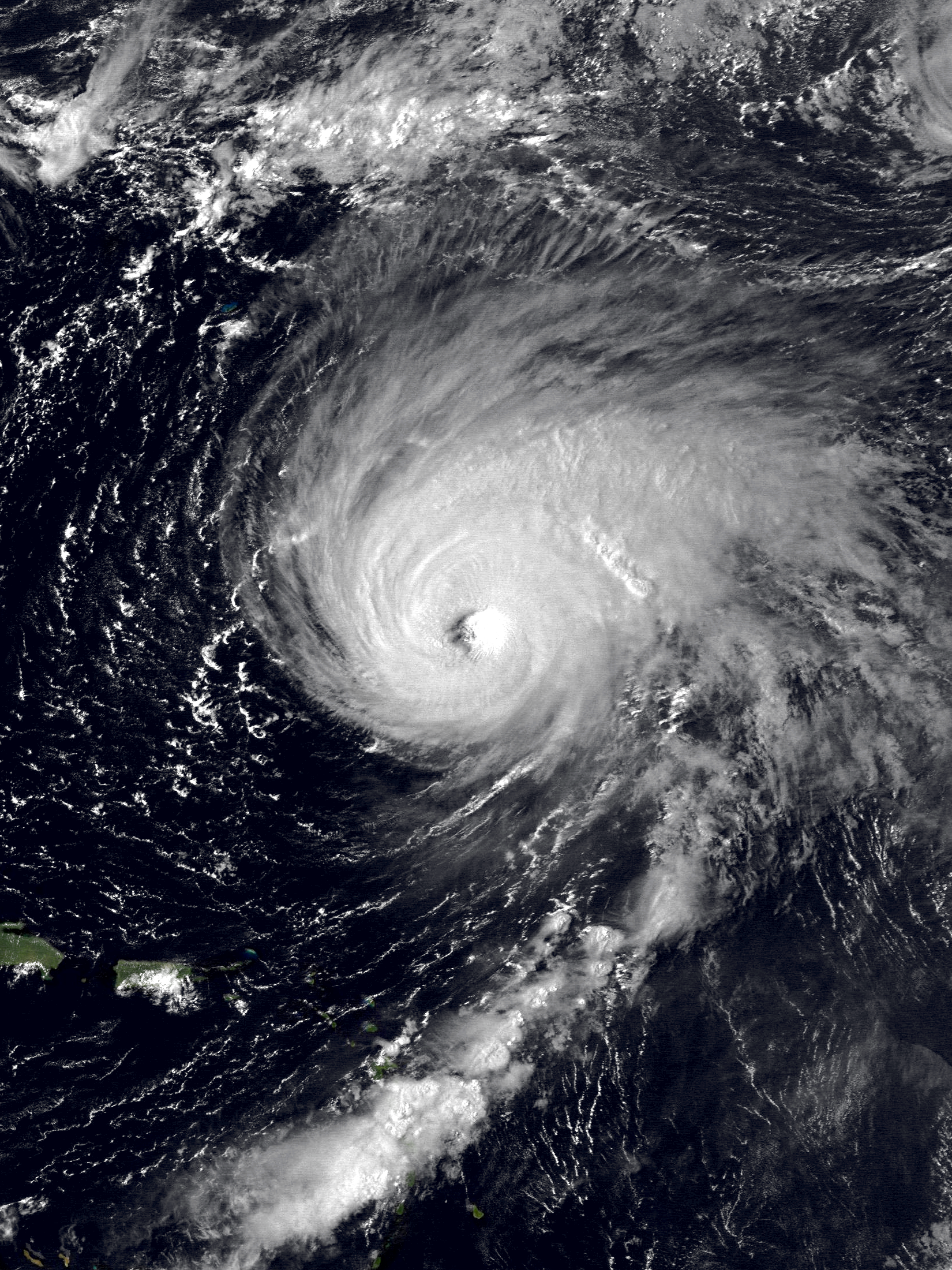
- Gabrielle shortly after peak intensity east of the Leeward Islands on September 6

Meteorological history
- Formed: August 30, 1989
- Dissipated: September 13, 1989

Category 4 major hurricane
- 1-minute sustained (SSHWS/NWS)
- Highest winds: 145 mph (230 km/h)
- Lowest pressure: 935 mbar (hPa); 27.61 inHg

Overall effects
- Fatalities: 9 direct
- Damage: Minimal
- Areas affected: Leeward Islands, Bermuda, Northeastern United States, and Eastern Canada
- IBTrACS
- Part of the 1989 Atlantic hurricane season

Hurricane Gabrielle was a powerful tropical cyclone that caused nine fatalities in the United States and Canada, despite remaining hundreds of miles offshore. The tenth tropical cyclone, seventh named storm, fifth hurricane, and first major hurricane of the 1989 Atlantic hurricane season, Gabrielle developed on August 30 from a tropical wave near the west coast of Africa. Under favorable conditions, the depression intensified and became Tropical Storm Gabrielle early on the following day. Rapid strengthening occurred thereafter, with Gabrielle reaching hurricane intensity early on September 1. After becoming a hurricane, further intensification was steady, though by September 5, Gabrielle peaked as a moderate Category 4 hurricane. On the following day, Gabrielle began to slowly level-off in intensity, while gradually curving northward. After weakening to a Category 2 hurricane, the storm passed east of Bermuda on September 8.

Gabrielle eventually decelerated, and by early on September 10, it curved westward and weakened to a tropical storm. Gabrielle re-curved northeastward on September 11 and began paralleling Nova Scotia. It further weakened to a tropical depression on September 12 and was then absorbed by a developing storm near Newfoundland on September 13. Due to its large size, Gabrielle produced swells and high tides in the Lesser Antilles, Bermuda, the East Coast of the United States, and Atlantic Canada. Rough seas along the East Coast of the United States caused one fatality in Maine, two in Massachusetts, one in New Jersey, and four in New York. In Nova Scotia, large waves swept one man to sea and eventually caused his drowning.

== Meteorological history ==
Map plotting the storm's track and intensity, according to the Saffir–Simpson scale Map key Saffir–Simpson scale Tropical depression (≤38 mph, ≤62 km/h) Tropical storm (39–73 mph, 63–118 km/h) Category 1 (74–95 mph, 119–153 km/h) Category 2 (96–110 mph, 154–177 km/h) Category 3 (111–129 mph, 178–208 km/h) Category 4 (130–156 mph, 209–251 km/h) Category 5 (≥157 mph, ≥252 km/h) Unknown Storm type Tropical cyclone Subtropical cyclone Extratropical cyclone, remnant low, tropical disturbance, or monsoon depression

A tropical wave moved off the coast of Africa on August 28 and entered into the Atlantic Ocean. Initially, the wave had moderate amounts of deep convection and was already well organized, which allowed it to quickly become a tropical cyclone. Based on ship reports, the wave was classified as Tropical Depression Ten beginning at 1200 UTC on August 30. Located 1,000 miles (1,600 km) southeast of Tropical Storm Felix, the depression tracked westward as a high pressure ridge formed between the two storms. Satellite imagery showed the depression developing a good outflow pattern. As a result, the National Hurricane Center upgraded the depression to Tropical Storm Gabrielle on August 31. It was noted that by as early as 1200 UTC later that day, Gabrielle was already rather large and well-defined. Gabrielle continued to move westward at 17 mph (27 km/h), and by early on September 1, the storm was upgraded to a hurricane. However, the storm was not operationally upgraded to a hurricane until late on September 2; Gabrielle was then located about 625 miles (1,006 km) west of Cape Verde.

After becoming a hurricane on September 1, Gabrielle continued to intensify, but at a slower pace. By 1200 UTC on September 2, the storm strengthened into a Category 2 hurricane while centered about halfway between the Leeward Islands and Cape Verde. Early on the following day, Gabrielle became a major hurricane when it reached Category 3 intensity. Later on September 3, a ridge of high pressure formed a wedge between Gabrielle and Hurricane Felix. At 2046 UTC on September 3, a National Oceanic and Atmospheric Administration reconnaissance aircraft flight reported a pressure of 937 mbar (27.7 inHg), which was the lowest barometric pressure recorded in association with Gabrielle. It was later noted that the aircraft may not have entered the area with the most intense winds. Although barometric pressures slowly increased, Gabrielle continued to intensify, and by September 4, it became a Category 4 hurricane. Later that day, a trough extending from the Atlantic Canada southeastward to the Florida/Georgia border caused Gabrielle to recurve northwestward.

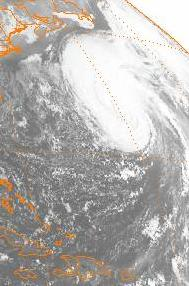
Hurricane Gabrielle southeast of Nova Scotia on September 8, 1989.

At 0000 UTC on September 5, Gabrielle reached its maximum sustained wind speed of 145 mph (233 km/h), though the barometric pressure was slightly higher than late on September 3. A hurricane hunter aircraft flown into the storm on September 5 reported that hurricane-force winds extended 100 miles (160 km) from the center and tropical storm force winds 250 miles (400 km). At the time, Gabrielle was recurving west-northwest at 15 mph (24 km/h). Hours later, another recon flight into Gabrielle revealed that the barometric pressure was slowly rising and the eye began to expand which is sign that the storm was slowly weakening. However, forecasters were unsure if the weakening was temporary or definite, prompting one meteorologist to say that "Gabrielle may have reached its peak intensity, but its too early to tell", to explain the uncertainty of Gabrielle's strength and if the storm will strengthen even further. The storm passed northeastward of the Leeward Islands and turned northward in response to a weakening in the ridge of high pressure caused by Hurricane Felix. Early on September 7, Gabrielle was downgraded to a Category 3 hurricane. Only six hours later, the storm further weakened to a Category 2 hurricane.

While a Category 2 hurricane, Gabrielle passed east of Bermuda early on September 8. Further weakening occurred and later that day, the storm was downgraded to a Category 1 hurricane. By early on September 9, Gabrielle began decelerating as it interacted with a frontal trough extending north to south across the western Atlantic Ocean, before becoming stationary about 475 miles (764 km) southeast of Cape Cod, Massachusetts on the following day. At 0600 UTC on September 10, Gabrielle weakened to a tropical storm. While being downgraded to a tropical storm, Gabrielle began drifting slowly westward in an area of weak steering well south of the jet stream. The storm later turned back eastward, ahead of an approaching cold front. On September 12, Gabrielle further weakened to a tropical depression, while being forced northeastward by a frontal trough. The depression lost most of its tropical characteristics, and by 1800 UTC on September 13, it merged with a storm system developing near Newfoundland on September 13.

== Preparations ==
The National Hurricane Center stated in its forecast on September 3 that Gabrielle had a 10 percent chance of affecting the Leeward Islands in three days. On September 5, meteorologists forecast the storm to bypass north of the Virgin Islands and told the press that it is too early to suggest that the storm might hit the United States four or five days ahead of its current position. As Hurricane Gabrielle moved west-northwest, forecasters at the National Hurricane Center advised residents along the East Coast of the United States to monitor the storm because of its large size and strong swells it is producing. When Gabrielle, recurved northwestward, the National Hurricane Center forecast the outer edge of the hurricane to graze Bermuda, bringing tropical storm force winds and strong waves to the island. In Bermuda, cruise ships and other water craft were advised of rough seas and many residents rushed to stores to buy emergency supplies.

== Impact ==
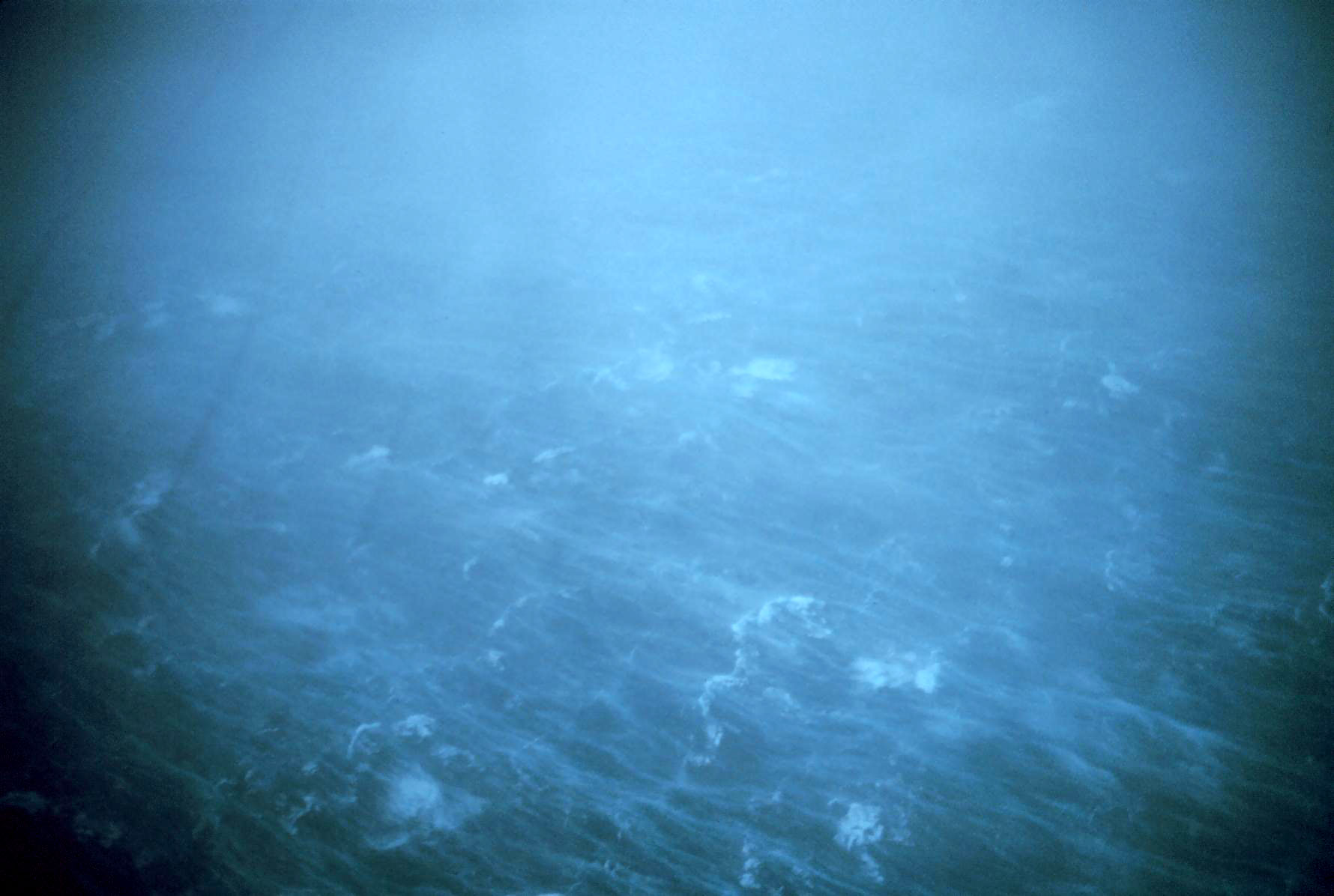
Rough seas from Hurricane Gabrielle viewed from a hurricane hunter aircraft.

Although Gabrielle remained far from land throughout its duration, its large size caused swells in the Lesser Antilles, the East Coast of the United States, Bermuda, and Atlantic Canada. Minor to moderate coastal flooding damage occurred in the Leeward Islands and the British Virgin Islands. Along the East Coast of the United States, rough seas caused one fatality in Maine, two in Massachusetts, one in New Jersey, and four in New York. Additionally, swells in Atlantic Canada caused one drowning fatality in Nova Scotia.

=== Lesser Antilles and Bermuda ===
In Barbados, Gabrielle brought 10 feet (3.0 m) waves and flooding to the island nation, causing minor damage. In Dominica and Guadeloupe, waves from Gabrielle caused severe beach erosion along the north and east coasts of the island but moderate damage was reported. However, the erosion brought by Gabrielle and later Hurricane Hugo resulted loss of 14 feet (4.3 m) of beach. The Caribbean islands of Nevis and British Virgin Islands also sustained minor to moderate beach erosion. In Bermuda, waves of 10–20 feet (3.0–6.1 m) were reported.

=== United States ===
Waves between 5 and 13 feet (1.5 and 4.0 meters) were reported along the East Coast of the United States from Florida to Maryland. A weather buoy in Outer Banks, North Carolina reported swells up to 10 feet (3.0 meters). One death occurred by drowning in New Jersey. A 37-year-old man was reported missing in New York City and presumed dead after his houseboat capsized in the heavy surf. Another houseboat also capsized, drowning a 58-year-old woman. On shore, a large wave swept two fishermen into the sea, where they drowned. Overall, four fatalities occurred in the state of New York. In Rhode Island two teenagers were rescued by the United States Coast Guard after being swept into the water by the waves.

Near Boston, Massachusetts, a 25-year-old man was reported missing in the Ipswich River north of Cape Ann after a motorboat capsized in the rough surf; two other occupants including an infant were rescued. Elsewhere in the state, two deaths were reported, both of which were related to rough surf. The United States Coast Guard rescued two surfers in New Hampshire, while looking for a swimmer who was reported missing earlier. In Tenants Harbor, Maine, a 19-year-old woman drowned after slipping off a rock shoreline. Two men who were with her tried to rescue the woman but to no avail as the rough seas overpowered them. The men themselves were later rescued by the crew of a fishing boat. Overall, Gabrielle caused eight fatalities along the East Coast of the United States.

=== Atlantic Canada ===
Just offshore of Nova Scotia, waves reached 40 feet (12 m) in height; a buoy near Shearwater measured swells up to 30 feet (9.1 m). Along the coastline, waves were about two stories high. In Gill Cove, two men walking near the shore were swept away by a large wave; one made it safely back to the coastline, though the other was lost and subsequently drowned. Rough sea also lashed Newfoundland, which caused 20 ships to be sheltered in the St. John's harbor.

== See also ==
- Other storms of the same name
- Storm surge
- Hurricane Edouard (1996) – similar track and intensity
