= List of storms named Chantal =

The name Chantal has been used for nine tropical cyclones: eight in the Atlantic Ocean and one in the South-West Indian Ocean.

In the Atlantic:

- Hurricane Chantal (1983) – a Category 1 hurricane that affected Bermuda.
- Hurricane Chantal (1989) – a Category 1 hurricane that made landfall near High Island, Texas.
- Tropical Storm Chantal (1995) – affected Atlantic Canada.
- Tropical Storm Chantal (2001) – degenerated into a tropical wave during its existence.
- Tropical Storm Chantal (2007) – remnants affected Newfoundland.
- Tropical Storm Chantal (2013) – among the fastest-moving tropical Atlantic tropical cyclones in the satellite era (1966–present).
- Tropical Storm Chantal (2019)
- Tropical Storm Chantal (2025) – made landfall in South Carolina.

In the South-West Indian:

- Cyclone Chantal (1961) – a Category 1 tropical cyclone.

== See also ==
- Tropical Storm Chantelle (1996) – a South-West Indian Ocean tropical cyclone with a similar name.
