= List of storms named Gabrielle =

The name Gabrielle has been used for ten tropical cyclones worldwide, seven in the Atlantic Ocean, one in the South-West Indian Ocean and two in the Australian region.

In the Atlantic:

- Hurricane Gabrielle (1989) – reached Category 4 strength and caused large ocean swells on the East Coast of the United States
- Tropical Storm Gabrielle (1995) – reached near-hurricane strength just prior to making landfall near La Pesca, Tamaulipas, causing minimal damage
- Hurricane Gabrielle (2001) – made landfall near Venice, Florida as a tropical storm, exited back into the ocean and strengthened into a Category 1 hurricane while moving out to sea
- Tropical Storm Gabrielle (2007) – weak tropical storm that made landfall on the Outer Banks of North Carolina, causing light damage
- Tropical Storm Gabrielle (2013) – short-lived, weak tropical storm that formed and dissipated in the Caribbean Sea south of Puerto Rico, but reformed close to Bermuda
- Tropical Storm Gabrielle (2019) – weak and disorganized tropical storm that dissipated over the eastern Atlantic, but later regenerated and intensified into a moderate tropical storm
- Hurricane Gabrielle (2025) – reached Category 4 strength east of Bermuda, then affected the Azores as a post-tropical cyclone

In the South-West Indian:

- Tropical Storm Gabrielle (1982) – moderate tropical storm that brushed the islands of Mauritius and Réunion without causing damage

In the Australian region:

- Tropical Low Gabrielle (2009) – downgraded to a tropical low in post-analysis, did not affect land
- Cyclone Gabrielle (2023) – strong tropical cyclone that crossed to the South Pacific basin and severely affected New Zealand as a subtropical system

After the 2022–23 season, the name Gabrielle was retired from the rotating lists of storm names in the Australian region. It was replaced with Gemm for future seasons.
