= Tropical Storm Gabrielle (1995) =

Atlantic tropical storm in 1995

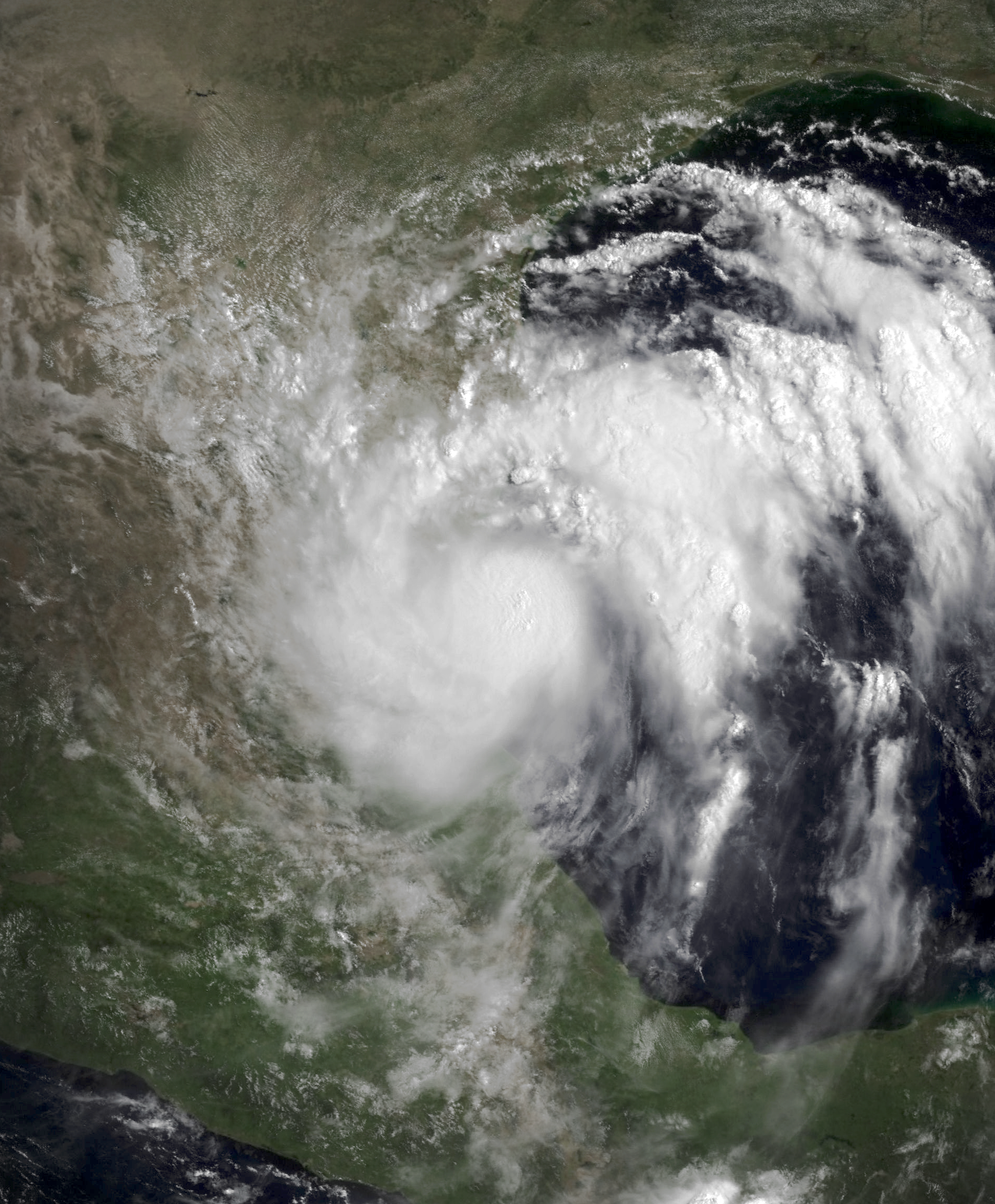
- Tropical Storm Gabrielle near peak intensity moving onshore of Tamaulipas on August 11

Meteorological history
- Formed: August 9, 1995
- Dissipated: August 12, 1995

Tropical storm
- 1-minute sustained (SSHWS/NWS)
- Highest winds: 70 mph (110 km/h)
- Lowest pressure: 988 mbar (hPa); 29.18 inHg

Overall effects
- Fatalities: 6 direct
- Damage: Minimal
- Areas affected: Northeast Mexico, southern Texas
- IBTrACS /
- Part of the 1995 Atlantic hurricane season

Tropical Storm Gabrielle caused moderate flooding in northeastern Mexico and southern Texas in August 1995. The eighth tropical cyclone and seventh named storm of the 1995 Atlantic hurricane season, Gabrielle developed from a tropical wave in the west-central Gulf of Mexico on August 9. Initially a tropical depression, the system gradually intensified and by the following day, it became a tropical storm. Favorable conditions caused Gabrielle to continue to strengthen, with the storm nearly reaching hurricane status late on August 11. However, it soon made landfall near La Pesca, Tamaulipas, thus halting further intensification. Once inland, Gabrielle rapidly weakened and dissipated by early on August 12.

As Gabrielle was impacting the east coast of Mexico, Hurricane Flossie in the Eastern Pacific was brushing the Baja Peninsula. The storm produced torrential rainfall in northeastern Mexico, totaling to 19.44 inches (494 mm). As a result, numerous reservoirs were filled, forcing dozens in southern Nuevo Leon to evacuate their homes. Additionally, highway infrastructure and streets in the region were affected. Damage in Mexico is unknown, though six fatalities were reported. Rainfall up to 6 inches (150 mm) brought minor flooding to Texas, mainly damaging unharvested cotton. Three days after dissipation, the remnants of Gabrielle also produced heavy thunderstorms in New Mexico on August 15.

== Meteorological history ==
Map plotting the storm's track and intensity, according to the Saffir–Simpson scale Map key Saffir–Simpson scale Tropical depression (≤38 mph, ≤62 km/h) Tropical storm (39–73 mph, 63–118 km/h) Category 1 (74–95 mph, 119–153 km/h) Category 2 (96–110 mph, 154–177 km/h) Category 3 (111–129 mph, 178–208 km/h) Category 4 (130–156 mph, 209–251 km/h) Category 5 (≥157 mph, ≥252 km/h) Unknown Storm type Tropical cyclone Subtropical cyclone Extratropical cyclone, remnant low, tropical disturbance, or monsoon depression

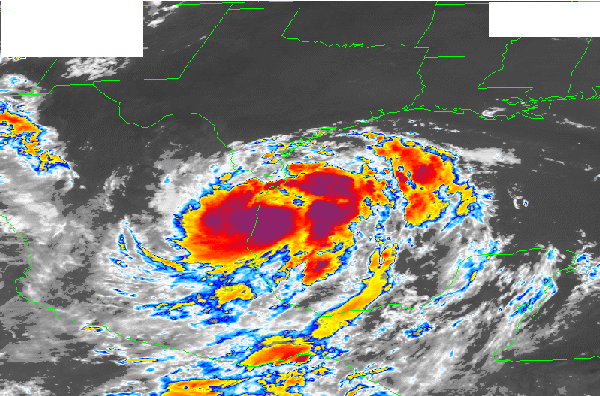
Gabrielle at landfall

A tropical wave emerged into the Atlantic Ocean off the west coast of Africa during the last week of July. As it tracked across the Atlantic, it remained a well-defined system, but never organized into a tropical cyclone. On August 8, the system entered the Gulf of Mexico, and by the following day, it developed a weak low-level circulation. The circulation became better defined later that day, and was confirmed by Reconnaissance aircraft that afternoon, when it was declared Tropical Depression Eight while east of Tamaulipas.

From the outset, the cyclone's motion was altered by Hurricane Flossie off the Pacific coast of Mexico. Initially, deep convection fired up gradually as the depression slowly tracked westward in the Gulf of Mexico. At 1200 UTC on August 10, the depression strengthened into Tropical Storm Gabrielle, as the storm curved southward. Gabrielle then strengthened slowly over the warm sea surface temperatures in a low wind shear environment, although land interaction slowed the intensification somewhat. The storm shifted once again onto a west-northwest course on August 11, moving very slowly towards the coast.

The storm made landfall at 2000 UTC on August 11, just south of La Pesca in the Mexican state of Tamaulipas, about 175 miles (282 km) south of the United States-Mexico border and about 90 miles (140 km) north of Tampico. Simultaneously, Gabrielle attained its peak intensity with a maximum sustained wind speed of 70 mph (110 km/h) and a minimum barometric pressure of 988 mbar (29.2 inHg). After landfall, the storm rapidly weakened, deteriorating to tropical depression status by early on August 12 over northeast Mexico. Six hours later, the surface circulation of Gabrielle dissipated over the mountains of the Sierra Madre Oriental, although its cloud pattern transited Mexico intact, moving into the Gulf of California before it sheared across northwest Mexico on August 15.

== Preparations and impact ==
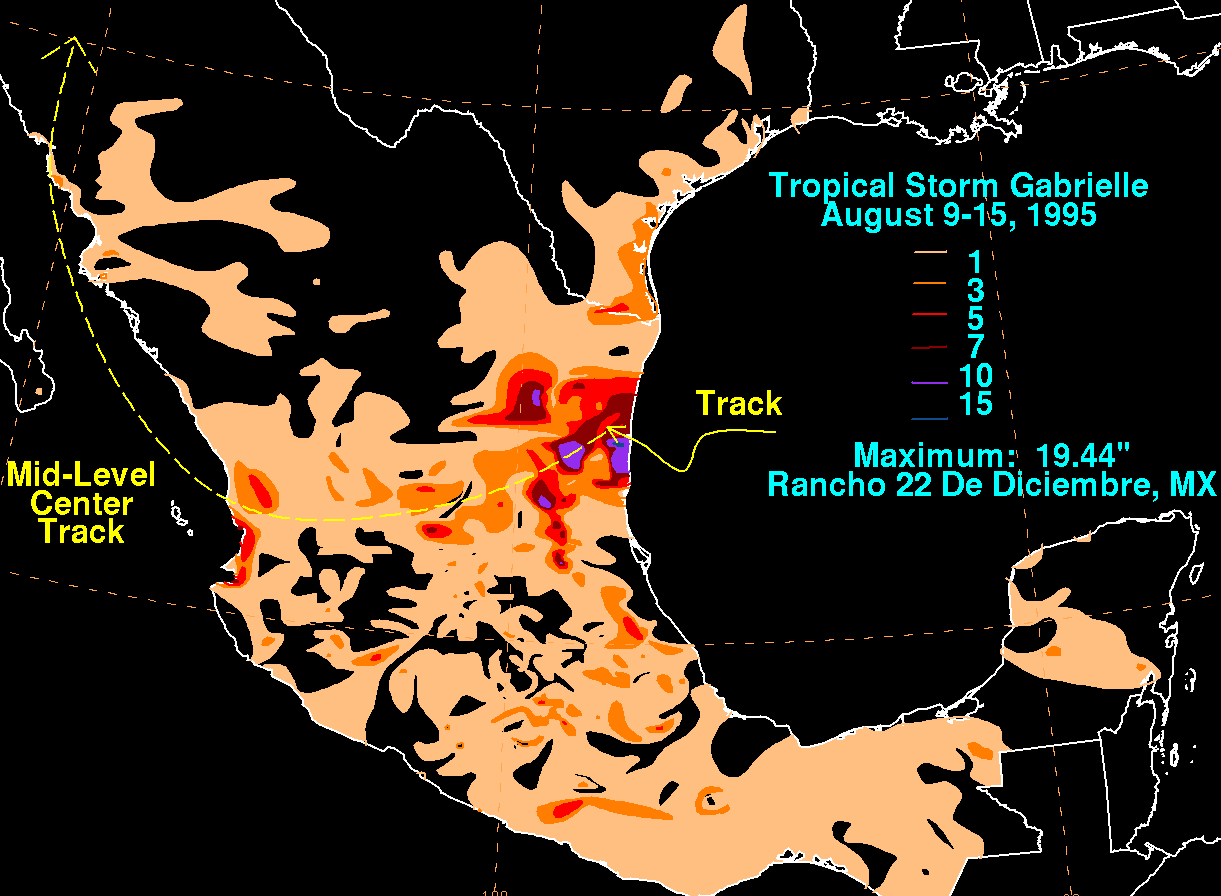
Gabrielle rainfall totals

Starting at 2100 UTC on August 9, a tropical storm warning was issued from Baffin Bay, Texas to La Pesca, Tamaulipas while Gabrielle was still Tropical Depression Eight. By 0900 UTC on the following day, the warning was expanded to include areas south to Tampico, Tamaulipas and extended further to Tuxpan, Veracruz twelve hours later. As the latter was occurring, the tropical storm warning was discontinued for Texas. Early on August 12, all the warnings in Mexico were discontinued, as the storm had already moved inland. 800 people were evacuated in Soto la Marina and San Fernando in Tamaulipas. People in poor villages in the Rio Grande Valley were given sandbags with Tropical Storm Gabrielle approaching.

Overall damage was generally minor. There were no reports of wind damage, although tropical storm-force winds affected the northern coast of Tamaulipas. A newspaper in Mexico reported up to 24 inches (610 mm) of precipitation across much of Tamaulipas and Nuevo Leon; this figure is in dispute, however, as the rainfall database maintained by Mexico's National Weather Service shows the maximum amount to lie under 20 inches (510 mm). The heavy rainfall from the storm filled nearly half the reservoirs in Nuevo Leon and Tamaulipas, which were almost empty due to drought conditions in the region. As a result, dozens in southern Nuevo Leon were forced to evacuation their homes. Rains from Gabrielle flooded streets and destroyed bridges and highways in northern Mexico. No storm surge recordings were taken in Mexico, although it is estimated by the National Hurricane Center that a surge of a few feet took place to the north of the track. Six fatalities were reported in Mexico as a result of Gabrielle.

In Texas, rainfall from the storm peaked at 6.26 inches (159 mm) in Weslaco, while many other areas in southern Texas reported only 1 to 3 inches (25 to 76 mm) of precipitation. Gabrielle's rain came after a drought, and some of it soaked in. The rains also damaged unharvested cotton. Otherwise, minor flooding occurred. Brownsville reported up to 4 inches (100 mm) of rain in association with Gabrielle. In extreme southern Texas, minor coastal flooding occurred at some of the beaches in the region. The remains of Gabrielle produced heavy thunderstorms in New Mexico on August 15.

== See also ==
- Tropical Storm Bret (2005)
- Tropical Storm Gert (2005)
- Other storms of the same name
- Timeline of the 1995 Atlantic hurricane season
