= Hurricane Dean (1989) =

Category 2 Atlantic hurricane in 1989

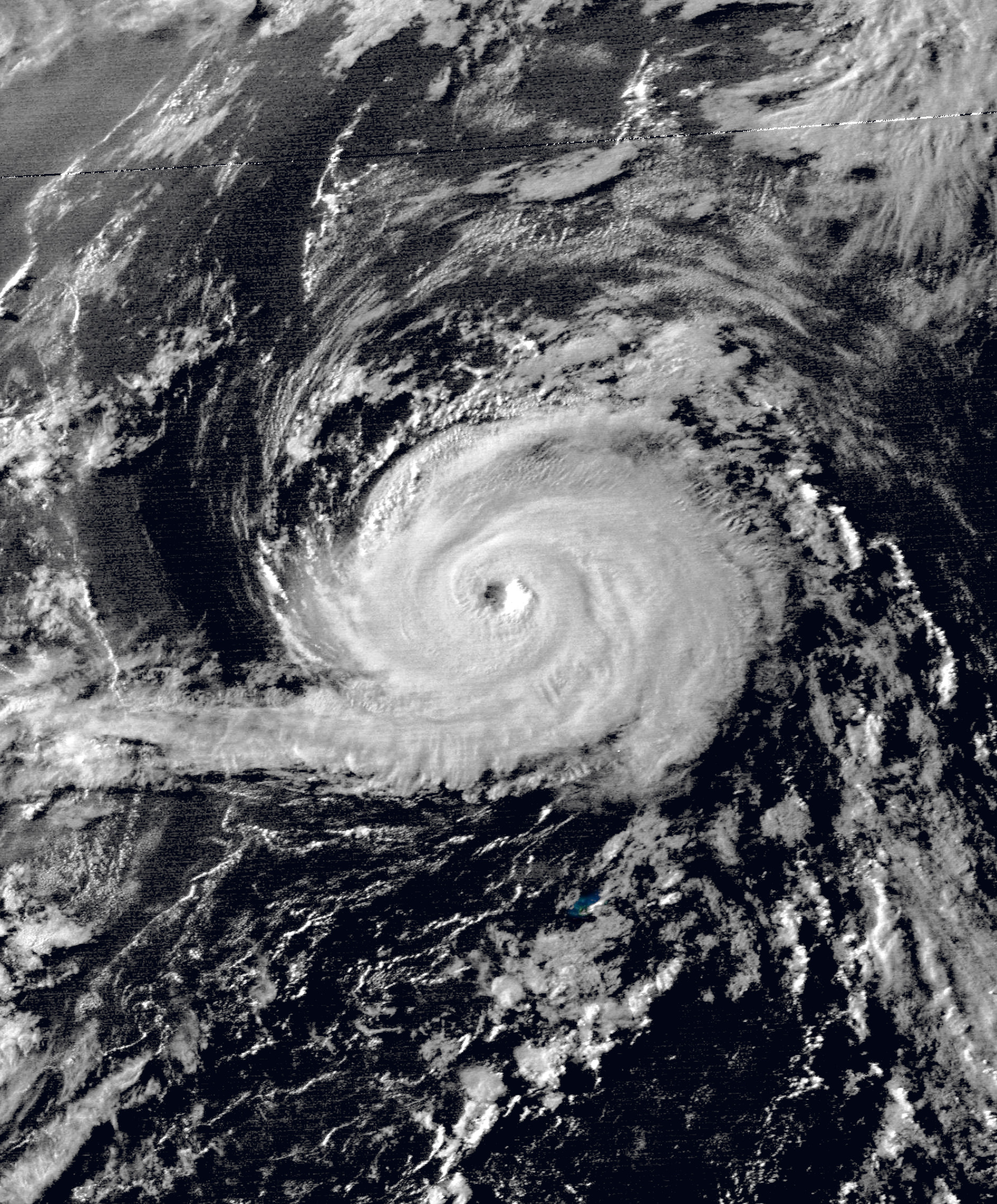
- Dean near peak intensity just north of Bermuda on August 6

Meteorological history
- Formed: July 31, 1989
- Dissipated: August 8, 1989

Category 2 hurricane
- 1-minute sustained (SSHWS/NWS)
- Highest winds: 105 mph (165 km/h)
- Lowest pressure: 968 mbar (hPa); 28.59 inHg

Overall effects
- Fatalities: None
- Damage: $8.9 million (1989 USD)
- Areas affected: Leeward Islands, Bermuda, Atlantic Canada
- IBTrACS
- Part of the 1989 Atlantic hurricane season

Hurricane Dean was a strong tropical cyclone that affected the United States and Atlantic Canada while remaining offshore in early August 1989. The fourth named storm and second hurricane of the 1989 Atlantic hurricane season, Dean formed on July 31 and reached tropical storm status the following day east of the Leeward Islands. Dean brushed the northern Leeward Islands as a Category 1 hurricane on the Saffir–Simpson Hurricane Scale, bringing light rain but producing no damage, before turning northward and striking Bermuda as a Category 2 hurricane. It continued northward before making landfall in southeastern Newfoundland.

Dean was initially difficult to forecast; it was thought to pose a possible threat to the Lesser Antilles, and as a result several evacuations occurred, and many hurricane watches and warnings were issued. However, as the storm turned northward, all watches and warnings in the Lesser Antilles were discontinued. As Dean approached Bermuda, a hurricane watch was issued, and was later upgraded to a hurricane warning. After the storm tracked away from the island, the hurricane warning was discontinued. In addition, a hurricane warning was briefly in effect for Sable Island, Nova Scotia. The storm left $8.9 million (1989 USD, 23.1 million 2026 USD) and sixteen injuries across Bermuda, but no fatalities were reported. In Atlantic Canada, Dean dropped light rain across Nova Scotia and Sable Island.

== Meteorological history ==
Map plotting the storm's track and intensity, according to the Saffir–Simpson scale Map key Saffir–Simpson scale Tropical depression (≤38 mph, ≤62 km/h) Tropical storm (39–73 mph, 63–118 km/h) Category 1 (74–95 mph, 119–153 km/h) Category 2 (96–110 mph, 154–177 km/h) Category 3 (111–129 mph, 178–208 km/h) Category 4 (130–156 mph, 209–251 km/h) Category 5 (≥157 mph, ≥252 km/h) Unknown Storm type Tropical cyclone Subtropical cyclone Extratropical cyclone, remnant low, tropical disturbance, or monsoon depression

A tropical wave moved off the coast of Africa on July 27, as detected by Meteosat imagery. By July 31 the tropical wave began to be classified, using the Dvorak Technique, by satellite analysts at the National Hurricane Center, in part due to persistent deep convection. Shortly thereafter, the system became organized enough that the National Hurricane Center began classifying it as Tropical Depression Five, roughly halfway between Cape Verde and the Lesser Antilles. The depression moved westward at 17 mph (27 km/h), intensifying as it did so, and eventually intensified enough to be upgraded to a tropical storm, which was named Dean by the National Hurricane Center.

Continuing generally westward, Dean continued to gradually intensify, and became a hurricane on August 2 after an Air Force reconnaissance flight had recorded hurricane-force winds. The following day a decreasing ridge of high pressure to the north and a trough of low pressure forming off the East Coast of the United States caused the storm to slow in its forward motion and turn northwest. The trough of low pressure forming off the East Coast of the United States was deepening, causing Dean to curve northward while remaining nearly stationary. The storm then began to accelerate to a forward speed of 17 mph (27 km/h) as it headed toward Bermuda. Thereafter, Dean intensified into a Category 2 hurricane, whilst the eastern half of the eyewall brushed Bermuda. Dean continued to intensify slightly after passing the island of Bermuda and became a Category 2 hurricane on August 7. While Dean was a Category 2 hurricane, it attained its peak intensity with winds of 105 mph (169 km/h) and a minimum pressure of 968 mbar (hPa; 28.59 inHg).

After peak intensity, the forward speed of the storm continued to increase as it approached Atlantic Canada while weakening back to a Category 1 hurricane. While approaching southern Newfoundland, Dean had weakened enough to be downgraded to a tropical storm on August 8. Shortly thereafter it made landfall on the south coast of Newfoundland with winds of 65 mph (105 km/h). Later that day Dean emerged into the far north Atlantic, and rapidly transitioned into an extratropical cyclone on the following day.

== Preparations ==
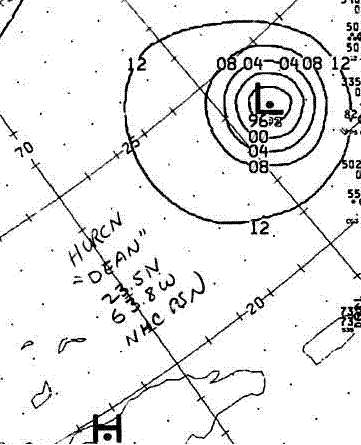
Depiction of Hurricane Dean on a weather map on August 5 at 0600 UTC

Hurricane Dean was very difficult to forecast in its early stages as the storm approached the eastern Caribbean. Even though most forecast models predicted that Dean would skirt the Leeward Islands, the track prediction models were not consistent and, as a result, uncertainty existed in justifying the posting of watches and warnings for the Leeward Islands and Puerto Rico. One track predicted Dean to threaten South Florida within three to four days.

Regardless, the National Hurricane Center issued hurricane warnings for Guadeloupe on August 2 and the rest of the Leeward Islands extending to the Virgin Islands. The uncertainty of the hurricane's forecast track forced residents and tourists in the Lesser Antilles to evacuate. In the British Virgin Islands, 80 American and Canadian tourists evacuated to hotels. In Puerto Rico, residents were advised to secure or stow away loose objects and stock up on emergency supplies. 1.1 million residents in the city of San Juan went to supermarkets to get much-needed supplies in anticipation that the storm might hit Puerto Rico. In Humacao, the National Guard evacuated 1,966 people living along a coastal highway. The islands of Martinique and Dominica were placed under a hurricane watch. The warning for Guadeloupe was discontinued at 2200 UTC when the hurricane no longer posed any threat to the island. Simultaneously, the hurricane watches in effect for Martinique and Dominica were also discontinued. As Dean continued westward, the National Hurricane Center issued a hurricane watch for the Turks and Caicos Islands. The watch was soon canceled as Dean made its northward turn towards Bermuda.

In Bermuda, the National Hurricane Center issued a hurricane watch on August 5. The hurricane watch was later changed to a hurricane warning the following day. Dean's approach to the island canceled numerous inbound and outbound flights. In Atlantic Canada, the National Hurricane Center issued a hurricane warning for Nova Scotia and Sable Island, while the Canadian forecasters issued a high wind advisory.

== Impact ==
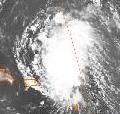
Hurricane Dean on August 3, 1989, north of the Leeward Islands

The outer bands of Hurricane Dean produced light rainfall and winds near 50 mph (80 km/h) across Barbuda or winds up to 60 mph (97 km/h) on the French territories of Saint Barthelemy and Saint Martin. The hurricane's eastern eyewall crossed over Bermuda, producing sustained winds of 81 mph (130 km/h), with gusts up to 113 mph (182 km/h). Bermuda's highest rainfall total from Dean was 2.45 in (50.8 mm). Strong winds from Hurricane Dean caused considerable power line damage, leaving 65,000 residents without electricity. The winds also caused minor roof damage. In Hamilton Harbour, 20 pleasure boats were damaged or sent adrift due to the rough seas. Flooding from the hurricane damaged fifteen houses. Sixteen people were injured by the hurricane, five of the injuries were considered serious. Damage in Bermuda amounted up to $8.9 million (1989 USD, 23.1 million 2026 USD).

Although Dean remained away from the United States coastline, it produced storm tides of 1.7 ft (0.52 m) to North Carolina. In Atlantic Canada, hurricane-force winds were reported in Nova Scotia and Cape Sable Island. Newfoundland reported winds of only 50 mph (80 km/h). Moderate rainfall was reported on Newfoundland, with most areas of the island experiencing at least 1 in (25 mm) of precipitation. Rainfall on Newfoundland peaked at 2.7 in (69 mm) on the south coast of the island, near the location of Dean's landfall. A majority of rainfall was reported on the west side of Dean, but minimal precipitation had been recorded to the east of the storm. High winds were reported on the eastern side of the storm, however, with lighter winds along the western quadrants of Dean. Offshore, waves up to 26 ft (7.9 m) were reported and Sable Island reported rainfall of 0.59 in (15 mm). Three sailors had to be rescued by the Canadian Coast Guard when their boat got dismasted during the storm.

== See also ==
- Other storms of the same name
- List of Bermuda hurricanes
