= Reggie White (running back) =

American football player (born 1979)

No. 22, 20
- Position: Running back

Personal information
- Born: July 11, 1979 (age 47); Houston, Texas, U.S.
- Listed height: 6 ft 0 in (1.83 m)
- Listed weight: 228 lb (103 kg)

Career information
- High school: Liberty (Liberty, Texas)
- College: Oklahoma State
- NFL draft: 2001: undrafted

Career history
- New York Jets (2001)*; Tennessee Titans (2001)*; Pittsburgh Steelers (2001)*; Jacksonville Jaguars (2001); Green Bay Packers (2002)*; Edmonton Eskimos (2004)
- * Offseason or practice squad member only

Awards and highlights
- Second-team All-Big 12 (2000)

Career NFL statistics
- Games played: 5
- Stats at Pro Football Reference

Reginald Andre White (born July 11, 1979) is an American former professional football player who was a running back for one season with the Jacksonville Jaguars of the National Football League (NFL). He played college football for the Oklahoma State Cowboys. He was also a member of the New York Jets, Tennessee Titans, Pittsburgh Steelers, Green Bay Packers and Edmonton Eskimos.

== Early life ==
White earned all-state and all-district honors in both football and basketball at Liberty High School in Liberty, Texas. He rushed for 1,209 yards and scored 17 touchdowns his senior year while garnering Offensive Player of the Year accolades. He also participated in track and field for the Panthers.

== College career ==
White played for the Oklahoma State Cowboys from 1998 to 2000. He was redshirted in 1997. He rushed for 1,049 yards and four touchdowns his senior year in 2000.

== Professional career ==
White signed with the New York Jets on April 25, 2001 after going undrafted in the 2001 NFL draft. He was released by the Jets on September 1, 2001.

White was signed to the Tennessee Titans' practice squad on September 4, 2001. He was released by the Titans on October 17, 2001.

White was signed to the Pittsburgh Steelers' practice squad on October 31, 2001. He was released by the Steelers on November 7, 2001.

White signed with the Jacksonville Jaguars on November 27, 2001 and played in five games for the team during the 2001 season. He was released by the Jaguars on September 1, 2002.

White was signed to the Green Bay Packers' practice squad on December 25, 2002. He was released by the Packers on August 6, 2003.

White played in five games for the Edmonton Eskimos in 2004.
