= Governor Daniel =

Governor Daniel may refer to:

- Bill Daniel (1915–2006), 5th Appointed Governor of Guam
- Price Daniel (1910–1988), 38th Governor of Texas

== See also ==
- Mitch Daniels (born 1949), 49th Governor of Indiana
