= Liberty High School (Liberty, Texas) =

Public high school located in Liberty, Liberty, Texas, United States

Location
- 2615 Jefferson Dr; Liberty, Texas 77575; United States
- Coordinates: 30.0753°N 94.7875°W

Information
- Type: Public
- School district: Liberty Independent School District
- Principal: Karen Slack
- Teaching staff: 40.61 (on FTE basis)
- Grades: 9-12
- Enrollment: 739 (2023-2024)
- Student to teacher ratio: 18.20
- Colors: Black & Gold
- Athletics conference: UIL 4A
- Mascot: Panther
- Website: Liberty High School

Liberty High School is a public high school serving students grades 9–12 located in the city of Liberty, Liberty County, Texas, United States. As one of the only two secondary schools and the only high school part of the Liberty Independent School District, it is attended by students from the cities of Liberty, and Ames as well as the unincorporated communities within Liberty County, including Moss Hill west of the Trinity River. Students compete in UIL region 4A. In 2022, the school received a "B" rating from the Texas Education Agency.

== Athletics ==
The Liberty Panthers compete in the following sports:

- Baseball
- Basketball
- Cross country
- Football
- Golf
- Powerlifting
- Soccer
- Softball
- Swimming
- Tennis
- Track and field
- Volleyball
- Wrestling

=== State Titles ===
- Softball
  - 2018 (4A), 2021 (4A), 2022 (4A), 2026 (4A/D2)

== Notable alumni ==
Reggie White (running back), American football player
