= Baylor University Chamber of Commerce =

American student association

- CC
- Founded: February 26, 1919; 106 years ago Baylor University
- Type: Service
- Affiliation: Independent
- Status: Active
- Scope: Local
- Motto: "Anything for Baylor"
- Colors: Green and Gold
- Chapters: 1
- Nickname: Chamber of Commerce, Baylor Chamber, the Chamber
- Headquarters: One Bear Place #85588; Waco, Texas 76798; United States
- Website: www.baylor.edu/chamber/

The Baylor University Chamber of Commerce is a student service organization at Baylor University in Waco, Texas. It was founded on February 26, 1919, it is the oldest student organization at Baylor. It organizes campus events, promotes Baylor's intercollegiate athletic teams and cares for the university's live bear mascots.

== History ==
The Baylor Chamber of Commerce has traced its origins to February 26, 1919, when the Baylor Business Men's Club was organized by a group of students interested in pursuing careers in business. The organization's purpose is to "promote the general welfare of Baylor University".

In 1924, the Chamber began an intramural sports program to "promote class rivalries and to discover a talent for the Baylor athletic programs". The program originated with a track meet intended to, "stimulate interest in track and to get the track prospects into shape." The Chamber also provided new band uniforms, using monetary pledges solicited from the Baylor and Waco communities. The year also marked the beginning of the annual Football Banquet. The first banquet honored Baylor's 1924 Southwest Conference Championship team.

Today, it is the oldest student organization at Baylor University.

== Symbols ==
The Chamber's motto is "Anything for Baylor". Its colors are green and gold, like Baylor University. Its nicknames are Chamber of Commerce, Baylor Chamber, or simply the Chamber.

== Activities ==
=== Baylor Bears ===
The chamber cares for the university's live bear mascots. They took on this responsibility shortly after the black bear became the university's mascot in 1917. It sponsored the Bill and Eva Williams Bear Habitat that opened in 2005.

=== Homecoming ===
The Chamber is in charge of organizing Homecoming weekend. Homecoming weekend activities begin with a Worship Service during Wednesday's Chapel. Mass Meeting, initially only open to freshmen, but now open to all students follows on Thursday. On Friday, other events are the Pigskin Revue, Pep Rally, Extravaganza, and Bonfire. Saturday's events begin with the nation's oldest and largest collegiate Homecoming Parade. After that, alumni and students cheer the Bears on at the football game.

=== Diadeloso ===
Diadeloso is a campus-wide holiday each spring that the Chamber also organizes to give students time to relax. Events include student organization booths, intramural tournaments, a dog show, food, and a music festival. It was originally known as May Day, then All-University Day, and was founded in 1934 and transferred to Chamber control in the early 1940s. The name Diadeloso (Spanish for "Day of the Bear") was adopted following a campus name contest in 1966. In 2022 the Chamber of Commerce was not allowed to host Diadeloso due to a hazing incident.

=== Family Weekend ===
In 1960, the Chamber of Commerce helped put on the first Parent's Day at Baylor. By 1970, the event had expanded to the full weekend with many events like a student talent show, a parent-faculty coffee, a dinner on campus, and other events designed to show parents the best of Baylor. In 2012, the name of the event changed from "Parents Weekend" to "Parent and Family Weekend".

=== Other activities ===
In 1991, the Chamber took control of the coordination of Freshman Runs. Previously, the Chamber assisted the sophomore class in operating this event. Other activities that the Chamber has put on include the sale of Slime Caps (1920), the Card Section (1952–1989), Football Program Sales (1960), Baylor University Athletic Hall of Fame (1960), Bear Bash (1968), the Baylor Faculty Jamboree (1990), the Robert L. Reid Distinguished Lecture Series (1992), and Banners.

== Scholarship ==
John Clifton, a pledge of the Baylor Chamber of Commerce, died on October 10, 1967. In 1968, a John Clifton Memorial Reading Room was established in Moody Library, and the John Clifton Memorial Scholarship was begun. Through various donations by Chamber alumni and fundraising projects by the Chamber, the endowment for the scholarship was completed in the fall semester of 1975.

== Controversies and scandals ==
On October 10, 1967, John Clifton, a pledge from Crosby, Texas, died of asphyxiation during hazing. A scholarship was subsequently created in his honor.

On April 5, 1990, as Diadeloso wound down late in the day, a group of Chambermen, including Scott Adams, were sitting in the bed of a pickup truck while breaking everything down and unloading from the day's events. As the group was driving down University Parks Drive, Adams and a sign were blown out of the bed of the truck. He fell head-first to the ground and never regained consciousness. He was pronounced dead several hours later. Reports indicated the cause of death as a punctured aorta caused by a fractured collarbone. Adams, who intended on going into ministry, had planned on staying at Baylor for a fifth year to train and take care of a bear cub in preparation for becoming the next Baylor Bear trainer. The cub was subsequently named "Judge Scotty" in remembrance of Adams.

== Notable alumni ==
- Brad Carson – U.S. Congressman and Defense Department Official
- Bill Daniel – Governor of Guam and member of the Texas House of Representatives.
- Clyde Hart – Baylor University track coach
- Leon Jaworski – Attorney
- Ken Paxton – Texas Attorney General, impeached
- Don Willett – Justice on the Supreme Court of Texas
- Roxanne Wilson – Attorney
