= Vara Martin Daniel =

American First Lady of Guam (1917–1987)

First Lady of Guam
- In role May 20, 1961 – January 20, 1963
- Governor: Bill Daniel

Personal details
- Born: June 17, 1917 Hillsboro, Texas
- Died: February 7, 1987 (aged 69) Liberty, Texas
- Party: Democratic
- Spouse: Bill Daniel
- Children: 4
- Education: Texas State College for Women
- Occupation: Educator, First Lady of Guam
- Other names: Vara Daniel, Vara M. Daniel, Vara Faye Martin Daniel

Vara Martin Daniel (1917-1987) was an American educator and First Lady of Guam.

== Early life ==
On June 17, 1917, Daniel was born in Hillsboro, Texas. Daniel's father was Will M. Martin, a politician. Daniel's mother was Daisy Beavers Martin. Daniel had two siblings, including Crawford C. Martin.

== Education ==
In 1938, Daniel earned a public school music degree and a minor in piano and English from Texas State College for Women in Denton, Texas.

== Career ==
Daniel is a former music teacher. Daniel is a former music program director for the Liberty public schools in Texas.

In 1961, when Bill Daniel was appointed by President John F. Kennedy as the Governor of Guam, Daniel became the First Lady of Guam on May 20, 1961, until January 20, 1963.

In 1972, Daniel became the president of the Trivium Club, until 1973.

== Personal life ==
Daniel's full name was Vara Faye Martin Daniel. Daniel's husband was Bill Daniel, an attorney, politician, and Governor of Guam. They had four children, Will, Ann, Susan and Dani. Daniel and her family lived in Guam, and Liberty, Texas.

On February 7, 1987, Daniel died from cancer in Liberty, Texas.

== Legacy ==
This is a list of places named in Daniel's legacy.

- Play park at M.D. Anderson Hospital.
- Vara Daniel Mammography Clinic at Liberty Baptist Hospital.
- Vara Martin Daniel Performing Arts Center at the Hill College Hill County Campus, located at 112 Lamar Dr. in Hillsboro, Texas.
- The Vara Martin Daniel Plaza at Baylor University in Waco, Texas.
- The Gov. Bill and Vara Daniel Historic Village at the Mayborn Museum Complex at Baylor University in Waco, Texas. Donated in 1984.
