= Liberty Independent School District =

School district in Texas, United States

Address
- 1600 Grand Ave Liberty, Texas, 77575; United States

District information
- Grades: PK–12
- Superintendent: Dustin McGee,
- Schools: 4
- NCES District ID: 4827450

Students and staff
- Enrollment: 2,424 (2023–2024)
- Teachers: 138.45 (on an FTE basis) (2023–2024)
- Staff: 219.17 (on an FTE basis) (2023–2024)
- Student–teacher ratio: 17.51 (2023–2024)

Other information
- Website: www.libertyisd.net

The Liberty Independent School District is a public school district in Liberty, Texas, United States, based in Liberty, Texas. In addition to Liberty, the district serves the city of Ames and the unincorporated community of Moss Bluff. In 2009, the school district was rated "academically acceptable" by the Texas Education Agency.

The Liberty Independent School District has two elementary schools, one intermediate school, and one high school. The school colors are black and gold. Liberty is classified as a 4A by the UIL.

== Schools ==
=== Elementary schools ===
- Liberty Elementary (Grades 2–5)
- San Jacinto Elementary (Grades PK–1)

=== Intermediate schools ===
- Liberty Middle School (Grades 6–8)

=== High schools ===
- Liberty High School (Grades 9–12)
