= Ames, Texas =

- City
- Interactive map of Ames, Texas
- Coordinates: 30°03′02″N 94°44′40″W
- Country: United States
- State: Texas
- County: Liberty

Area
  - Total: 3.30 sq mi (8.55 km^{2})
  - Land: 3.30 sq mi (8.55 km^{2})
  - Water: 0 sq mi (0.00 km^{2})
- Elevation: 69 ft (21 m)

Population (2020)
  - Total: 937
  - Density: 363.6/sq mi (140.39/km^{2})
- Time zone: UTC−6 (Central (CST))
  - Summer (DST): UTC−5 (CDT)
- ZIP Code: 77575
- Area code: 936
- FIPS code: 48-03072
- GNIS feature ID: 2409698
- Website: www.cityofamestexas.com

Ames is a city in Liberty County, Texas, United States. The population was 937 at the 2020 census.

== Geography ==
According to the United States Census Bureau, the city has a total area of 3.2 square miles (8.3 km^{2}), all land.

== Demographics ==
Historical population
Census	Pop.	Note	%±
1980	1,155		—
1990	989		−14.4%
2000	1,079		9.1%
2010	1,003		−7.0%
2020	937		−6.6%
U.S. Decennial Census; 1850–1900 1910; 1920 1930 1940; 1950 1960 1970; 1980 1990 2000; 2010

=== Racial and ethnic composition ===
Ames city, Texas – Racial and ethnic composition Note: the US Census treats Hispanic/Latino as an ethnic category. This table excludes Latinos from the racial categories and assigns them to a separate category. Hispanics/Latinos may be of any race.
Race / Ethnicity (NH = Non-Hispanic)	Pop 2000	Pop 2010	Pop 2020	% 2000	% 2010	% 2020
White alone (NH)	74	85	77	6.86%	8.47%	8.22%
Black or African American alone (NH)	964	839	700	89.34%	83.65%	74.71%
Native American or Alaska Native alone (NH)	1	0	0	0.09%	0.00%	0.00%
Asian alone (NH)	3	1	8	0.28%	0.10%	0.85%
Native Hawaiian or Pacific Islander alone (NH)	0	0	0	0.00%	0.00%	0.00%
Other race alone (NH)	9	27	22	0.83%	2.69%	2.35%
Mixed race or Multiracial (NH)	11	13	34	1.02%	1.30%	3.63%
Hispanic or Latino (any race)	17	38	96	1.58%	3.79%	10.25%
Total	1,079	1,003	937	100.00%	100.00%	100.00%

=== 2020 census ===
As of the 2020 census, Ames had a population of 937, 372 households, and 231 families residing in the city. The median age was 45.3 years. 21.2% of residents were under the age of 18 and 19.5% of residents were 65 years of age or older. For every 100 females there were 104.1 males, and for every 100 females age 18 and over there were 103.9 males age 18 and over.

18.4% of residents lived in urban areas, while 81.6% lived in rural areas.

Of the 372 households, 29.8% had children under the age of 18 living in them. Of all households, 36.0% were married-couple households, 27.2% were households with a male householder and no spouse or partner present, and 33.6% were households with a female householder and no spouse or partner present. About 27.2% of all households were made up of individuals and 12.6% had someone living alone who was 65 years of age or older.

There were 438 housing units, of which 15.1% were vacant. Among occupied housing units, 75.8% were owner-occupied and 24.2% were renter-occupied. The homeowner vacancy rate was 2.7% and the rental vacancy rate was 10.0%.

Racial composition as of the 2020 census
Race	Percent
White	9.6%
Black or African American	75.0%
American Indian and Alaska Native	0.7%
Asian	0.9%
Native Hawaiian and Other Pacific Islander	0%
Some other race	8.9%
Two or more races	4.9%

=== 2000 census ===
As of the census of 2000, there were 1,079 people, 407 households, and 293 families residing in the city. The population density was 340.5 inhabitants per square mile (131.5/km^{2}). There were 444 housing units at an average density of 140.1 per square mile (54.1/km^{2}). The racial makeup of the city was 7.04% White, 89.34% African American, 0.28% Native American, 0.28% Asian, 1.58% from other races, and 1.48% from two or more races. Hispanic or Latino of any race were 1.58% of the population.

There were 407 households, out of which 31.2% had children under the age of 18 living with them, 42.3% were married couples living together, 24.8% had a female householder with no husband present, and 27.8% were non-families. 25.1% of all households were made up of individuals, and 9.1% had someone living alone who was 65 years of age or older. The average household size was 2.65 and the average family size was 3.18.

In the city, the population was spread out, with 28.3% under the age of 18, 8.2% from 18 to 24, 25.3% from 25 to 44, 24.7% from 45 to 64, and 13.5% who were 65 years of age or older. The median age was 36 years. For every 100 females, there were 89.6 males. For every 100 females age 18 and over, there were 83.4 males.

The median income for a household in the city was $23,421, and the median income for a family was $26,429. Males had a median income of $28,833 versus $21,250 for females. The per capita income for the city was $12,491. About 28.6% of families and 31.6% of the population were below the poverty line, including 38.3% of those under age 18 and 27.7% of those age 65 or over.

== Education ==
Ames is served by the Liberty Independent School District. The Liberty Independent School District has two elementary schools, one intermediate school, and one high school. Students attend Liberty High School.

Cody Abshier is the Superintendent of Schools.
