= Hurricane Cosme (1989) =

Category 1 Pacific hurricane in 1989

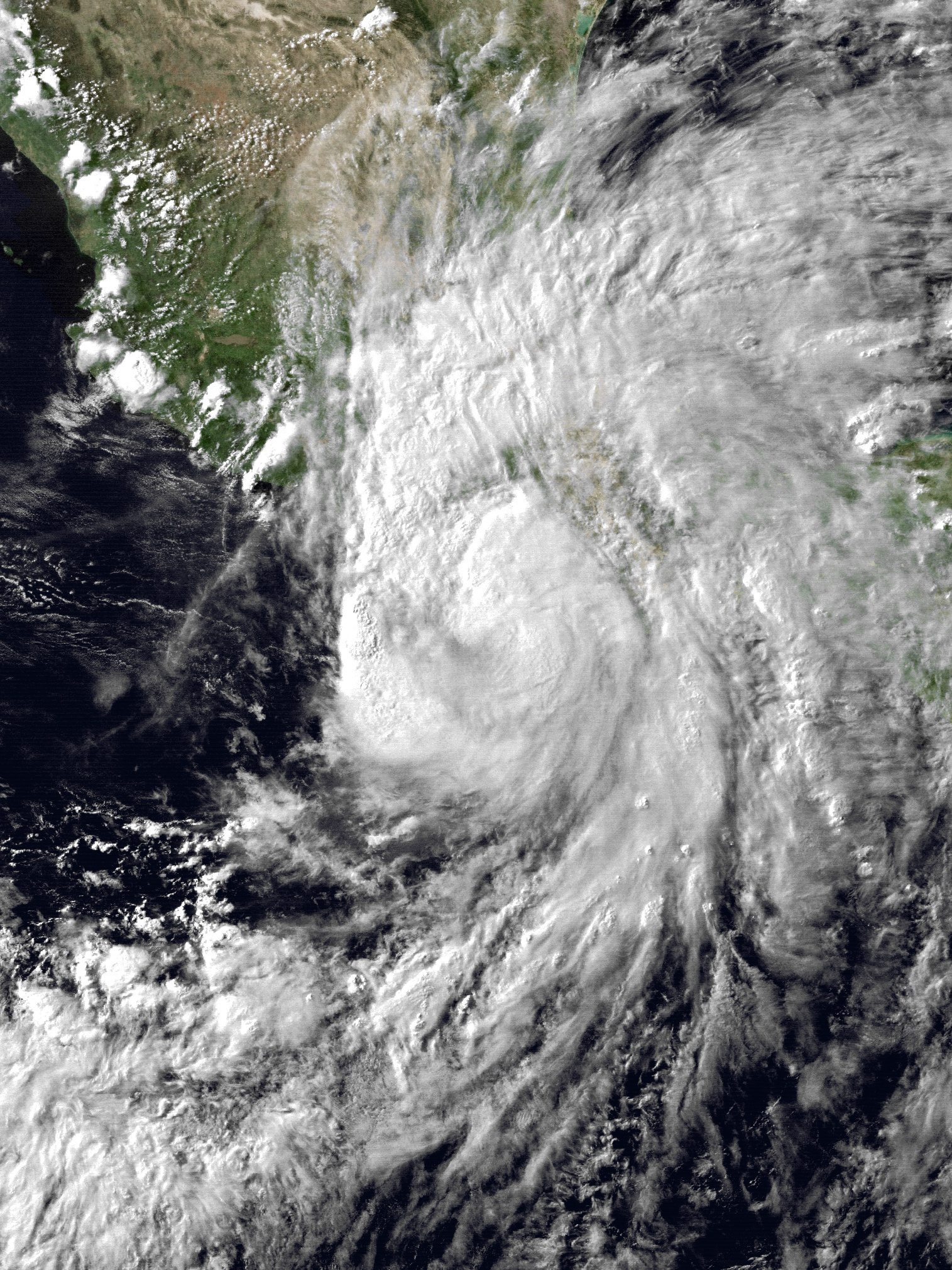
- Hurricane Cosme at peak intensity off the southwest coast of Mexico on June 21

Meteorological history
- Formed: June 19, 1989
- Dissipated: June 23, 1989

Category 1 hurricane
- 1-minute sustained (SSHWS/NWS)
- Highest winds: 85 mph (140 km/h)
- Lowest pressure: 979 mbar (hPa); 28.91 inHg

Overall effects
- Fatalities: 30
- Areas affected: Mexico, East Texas
- IBTrACS
- Part of the 1989 Pacific hurricane season

Hurricane Cosme was an unusually large tropical cyclone that made landfall in south-western Mexico in June 1989. The third tropical storm and second hurricane of the 1989 Pacific hurricane season, Cosme formed on June 19 from a tropical wave. The storm initially moved westward before being upgraded into Tropical Storm Cosme, ultimately intensifying into a Category 1 hurricane. Cosme turned northward and made landfall near Acapulco during the night of June 21. It rapidly weakened over land. The storm caused excessive rainfall on land, leading to deadly and destructive flooding. It is estimated that 30 people died in the hurricane.

== Meteorological history ==
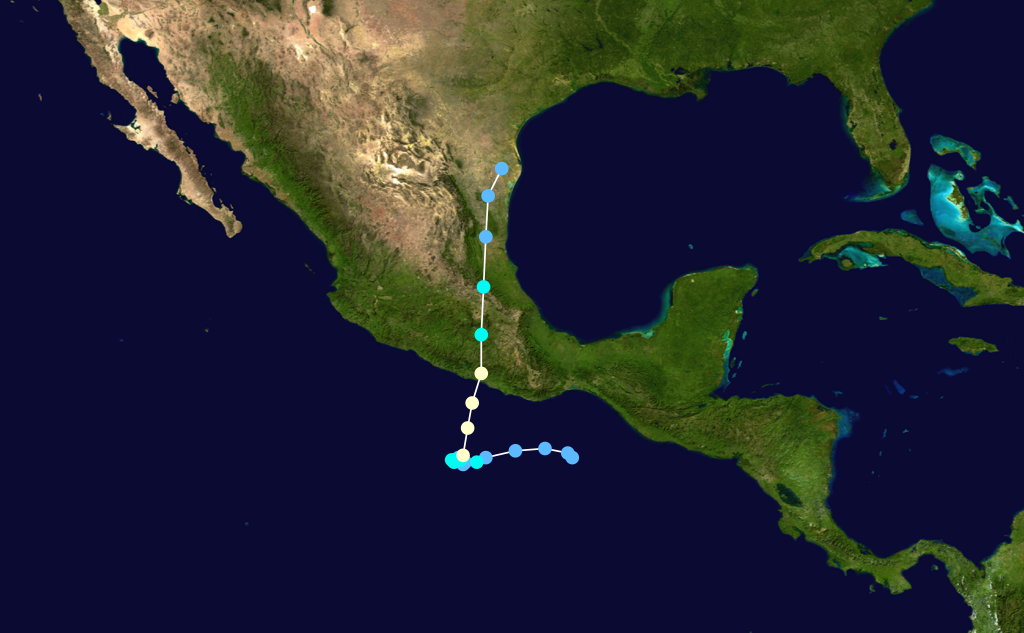
Map plotting the storm's track and intensity, according to the Saffir–Simpson scale Map key Saffir–Simpson scale Tropical depression (≤38 mph, ≤62 km/h) Tropical storm (39–73 mph, 63–118 km/h) Category 1 (74–95 mph, 119–153 km/h) Category 2 (96–110 mph, 154–177 km/h) Category 3 (111–129 mph, 178–208 km/h) Category 4 (130–156 mph, 209–251 km/h) Category 5 (≥157 mph, ≥252 km/h) Unknown Storm type Tropical cyclone Subtropical cyclone Extratropical cyclone, remnant low, tropical disturbance, or monsoon depression

In early June 1989, a tropical wave emerged from the west coast of Africa and traversed the Atlantic Ocean, eventually crossing into the eastern North Pacific. Initially, several centers of circulation were associated with the system. Continuing to organize, the storm is estimated to have attained tropical depression status at 00:00 UTC on June 18. The depression was broad and lacked substantial thunderstorm activity. However, it did have respectable outflow and banding. It moved towards the west and intensified into a tropical storm at 00:00 UTC on June 20, 48 hours after being classified.

Upon being named, Cosme meandered and remained nearly stationary as it continued to intensify. It became a hurricane midday UTC on June 21; this upgrade was delayed in real time. At this time, the hurricane accelerated towards the north. As the cyclone approached the coast of Mexico, it reached maximum sustained winds of 85 mph (140 km/h) and a minimum barometric pressure of 979 mbar (28.91 inHg).

During the night of June 21, Cosme made landfall just east of Acapulco. It moved inland and quickly deteriorated, weakening into a tropical storm shortly after coming ashore. It trekked northward through eastern Mexico and further diminished into a tropical depression before becoming indistinguishable south of Brownsville, Texas on June 23. Tropical Storm Allison's development in the Gulf of Mexico was partially related to residual conditions from Cosme's remnants.

== Preparations and impact ==
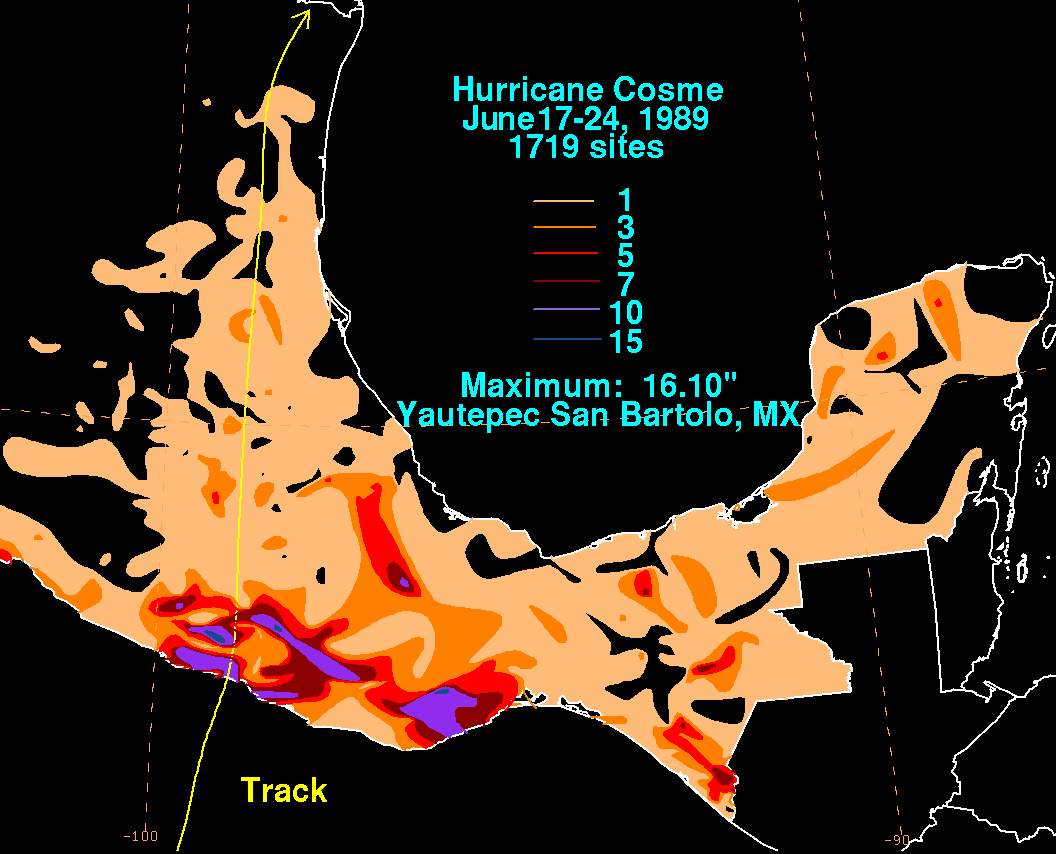
Rainfall map of Cosme

Prior to the hurricane's landfall, Mexican officials evacuated nearly 260 people from low-lying areas near Acapulco. Ports in the region were also closed several days before the storm and remained closed for two days after as a precaution. In addition, flash flood watches and warnings were issued. Cosme's heavy rains caused flooding that drowned at least 30 people. Many adobe homes were destroyed, but the specific cost of damage is unknown. The highest rainfall recorded in relation to Cosme was 16.1 in (410 mm) in San Bartolo Yautepec, Mexico. Many mountainous areas received rainfall in excess of 7 in (180 mm) and most other areas received 1 in (25 mm). High winds produced by the storm damaged numerous trees and power lines throughout the affected areas. Authorities in Acapulco stated that there were no major damage or injuries from the storm, with only one hotel sustaining minor damage. In Mexico City, flooding up to one meter was reported. At least 50 homes sustained damage from the floodwaters.

== See also ==
- Other storms of the same name
- List of Atlantic–Pacific crossover hurricanes#Other storms – tropical cyclones that formed in one basin, dissipated, and re-developed in the other
