= Moss Bluff, Texas =

Human settlement in Texas, United States

Coordinates: 29°56′15″N 94°45′48″W

Moss Bluff is an unincorporated community in Liberty County, Texas, United States.

== Education ==
Moss Bluff is zoned to schools in the Liberty Independent School District.
