= Bill Daniel (politician) =

American politician

William "Bill" Daniel
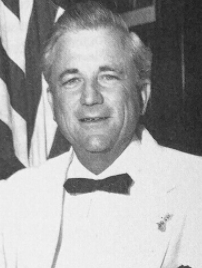

5th Appointed Governor of Guam
- In office May 20, 1961 – January 20, 1963
- Appointed by: John F. Kennedy
- Preceded by: Joseph Flores
- Succeeded by: Manuel Flores Leon Guerrero

Member of the Texas House of Representatives from the 20th district
- In office January 13, 1953 – January 11, 1955
- Preceded by: James Bell Pattison
- Succeeded by: J.C. 'Zeke' Zbranek

Member of the Texas House of Representatives from the 14th district
- In office January 11, 1949 – January 13, 1953
- Preceded by: David Read
- Succeeded by: Paul Franklin Smith Hill

Personal details
- Born: November 20, 1915 Dayton, Texas, U.S.
- Died: June 20, 2006 (aged 90) Liberty, Texas, U.S.
- Party: Democratic
- Spouse: Vara Martin Daniel
- Children: 4
- Occupation: Politician, Actor

William Partlow Daniel (November 20, 1915 – June 20, 2006), was an American politician and actor who served Governor of Guam from 1961 to 1963 and Democratic member of the Texas House of Representatives. Born in Dayton, Texas, and a graduate of Baylor University and a member of the Baylor University Chamber of Commerce, he spent the majority of his life working as a lawyer in Liberty County, Texas.

== Early life ==
Bill Daniel was born into a wealthy and prominent Texas family, his older brother Price Daniel Sr. served as Governor of Texas (1957–1963), Texas Supreme Court Justice and a US Senator. Daniel made large donations to good causes especially to his alma mater Baylor University, several of the campus buildings are named after him, his late wife Vara and other members of the Daniel family.

== Political career ==
=== Texas House of Representatives ===
From 1949 to 1953 he served as a Democratic Party member of the Texas House of Representatives for the 14th District, his brother Price had previously held this office from 1939 to 1945.

=== Governorship (1961–1963) ===
In 1961, U.S. President John F. Kennedy appointed him to the position of governor of Guam, an office that he held from May 20, 1961, to January 20, 1963.

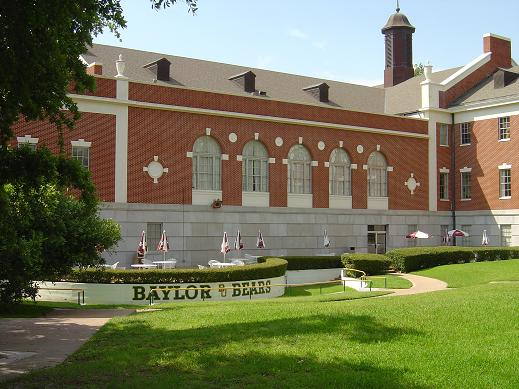
Bill Daniel Student Center, Baylor University, Waco, Texas.

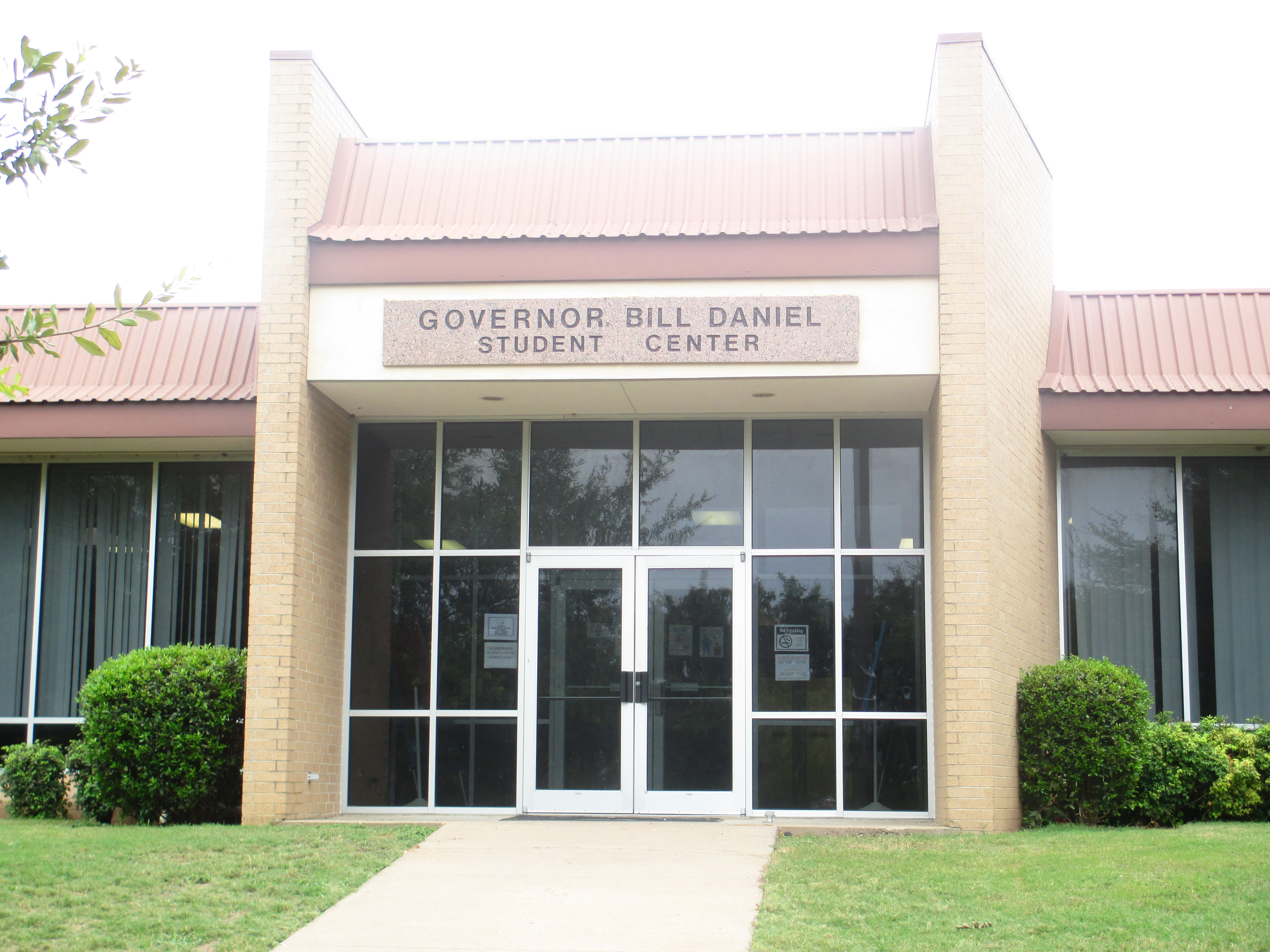
The Governor Bill Daniel Student Center at Hill College in Hillsboro, Texas, is named for the former governor of Guam, Bill Daniel.

His main achievement as governor was to arrange for the removal of the requirement of a "security clearance" to enter or leave Guam, by persuading Kennedy to sign an executive order (No.11045), rescinding the one put in place during 1941 by President Franklin D. Roosevelt. The old (wartime) travel restrictions required that all civilians wishing to visit Guam needed to obtain approval from a senior US Navy officer based in Washington, D.C.; this often took weeks to obtain. This was obviously an obstacle to development, especially in the area of tourism, and its removal greatly benefited the economy of the territory.

His appointment resulted in the first occasion in which brothers simultaneously held governorships in the United States, as his older brother Price was governor of Texas for the entire time of his service as governor of Guam.

== Acting career ==
Bill Daniel appeared in the John Wayne film The Alamo playing Colonel Neill. Daniel also provided the film with 400 longhorns and hundreds of horses from his ranch. Daniel's most memorable scene from the film is suggesting a courier named Smitty, played by Frankie Avalon, dismount for food and rest, which Smitty refuses in order to return to help defend the Alamo.

Year	Title	Role	Notes
1960	The Alamo	Colonel Neill	

== Death ==
Bill Daniel died on June 20, 2006, at his home in Liberty, Texas, at the age of 90.

Texas House of Representatives
Preceded by David Read	Member of the Texas House of Representatives from District 14 (Liberty); 1949–1953	Succeeded by Paul Franklin Smith Hill
Preceded by James Bell Pattison	Member of the Texas House of Representatives from District 20; 1953–1955	Succeeded by J.C. 'Zeke' Zbranek
Government offices
Preceded by Joseph F. Flores	Governor of Guam; 1961–1963	Succeeded by Manuel Flores Leon Guerrero
