= Liberty, Texas =

- City
- Seal

- Location of Liberty, Texas
- Coordinates: 30°03′33.5″N 94°47′45.7″W
- Country: United States
- State: Texas
- County: Liberty

Area
  - Total: 45.77 sq mi (118.55 km^{2})
  - Land: 44.52 sq mi (115.31 km^{2})
  - Water: 1.25 sq mi (3.24 km^{2})
- Elevation: 16 ft (4.9 m)

Population (2020)
  - Total: 8,279
  - Density: 209.2/sq mi (80.78/km^{2})
- Time zone: UTC-6 (Central (CST))
  - Summer (DST): UTC-5 (CDT)
- ZIP code: 77575
- Area code: 936
- FIPS code: 48-42568
- GNIS feature ID: 2410832
- Website: www.cityofliberty.org

Liberty is a city in the U.S. state of Texas, within Liberty County. The population was 8,279 at the 2020 census. It serves as the county seat of Liberty County.

Liberty is the third oldest city in the state—established in 1831 on the banks of the Trinity River. The city also has a twin of the Liberty Bell from Philadelphia, Pennsylvania. Its area code is 936 and its ZIP code is 77575.

== Geography ==
According to the United States Census Bureau, the city has a total area of 35.4 square miles (92 km^{2}), of which 35.0 square miles (91 km^{2}) is land and 0.4 square miles (1.0 km^{2}) (1.02%) is water.

=== Climate ===
The climate in this area is characterized by hot, humid summers and generally mild to cool winters. According to the Köppen Climate Classification system, Liberty has a humid subtropical climate, abbreviated "Cfa" on climate maps.

Climate data for Liberty, Texas (1991–2020)
Month	Jan	Feb	Mar	Apr	May	Jun	Jul	Aug	Sep	Oct	Nov	Dec	Year
Mean daily maximum °F (°C)	64.0 (17.8)	67.1 (19.5)	73.5 (23.1)	79.3 (26.3)	85.8 (29.9)	91.1 (32.8)	93.4 (34.1)	94.2 (34.6)	90.0 (32.2)	82.8 (28.2)	72.4 (22.4)	65.3 (18.5)	79.9 (26.6)
Daily mean °F (°C)	52.6 (11.4)	56.1 (13.4)	62.5 (16.9)	68.4 (20.2)	75.6 (24.2)	81.4 (27.4)	83.5 (28.6)	83.8 (28.8)	79.5 (26.4)	70.8 (21.6)	60.8 (16.0)	53.9 (12.2)	69.1 (20.6)
Mean daily minimum °F (°C)	41.2 (5.1)	45.1 (7.3)	51.6 (10.9)	57.6 (14.2)	65.5 (18.6)	71.7 (22.1)	73.6 (23.1)	73.5 (23.1)	68.9 (20.5)	58.8 (14.9)	49.2 (9.6)	42.6 (5.9)	58.3 (14.6)
Average precipitation inches (mm)	5.12 (130)	3.90 (99)	3.98 (101)	4.60 (117)	5.54 (141)	6.05 (154)	5.02 (128)	5.52 (140)	6.85 (174)	6.34 (161)	4.72 (120)	5.18 (132)	62.82 (1,597)
Average snowfall inches (cm)	0.0 (0.0)	0.0 (0.0)	0.0 (0.0)	0.0 (0.0)	0.0 (0.0)	0.0 (0.0)	0.0 (0.0)	0.0 (0.0)	0.0 (0.0)	0.0 (0.0)	0.0 (0.0)	0.2 (0.51)	0.2 (0.51)
Source: NOAA

== Demographics ==
Historical population
Census	Pop.	Note	%±
1860	584		—
1870	458		−21.6%
1880	497		8.5%
1900	865		—
1910	980		13.3%
1920	1,117		14.0%
1930	2,187		95.8%
1940	3,087		41.2%
1950	4,163		34.9%
1960	6,127		47.2%
1970	5,591		−8.7%
1980	7,945		42.1%
1990	7,733		−2.7%
2000	8,033		3.9%
2010	8,397		4.5%
2020	8,279		−1.4%
U.S. Decennial Census; 1850–1900 1910; 1920 1930 1940; 1950 1960 1970; 1980 1990 2000; 2010

=== 2020 census ===
As of the 2020 census, Liberty had a population of 8,279, a median age of 37.8 years, 24.9% of residents under the age of 18, and 17.1% of residents 65 years of age or older. For every 100 females there were 97.5 males, and for every 100 females age 18 and over there were 95.2 males age 18 and over. There were 2,421 families residing in the city.

75.1% of residents lived in urban areas, while 24.9% lived in rural areas.

There were 2,955 households in Liberty, of which 35.5% had children under the age of 18 living in them. Of all households, 47.2% were married-couple households, 17.2% were households with a male householder and no spouse or partner present, and 30.2% were households with a female householder and no spouse or partner present. About 26.0% of all households were made up of individuals and 13.2% had someone living alone who was 65 years of age or older.

There were 3,329 housing units, of which 11.2% were vacant. The homeowner vacancy rate was 0.9% and the rental vacancy rate was 11.1%.

Racial composition as of the 2020 census
Race	Number	Percent
White	4,949	59.8%
Black or African American	1,049	12.7%
American Indian and Alaska Native	64	0.8%
Asian	94	1.1%
Native Hawaiian and Other Pacific Islander	1	0.0%
Some other race	1,330	16.1%
Two or more races	792	9.6%
Hispanic or Latino (of any race)	2,309	27.9%

=== 2010 census ===
As of the 2010 census Liberty had a population of 8,397. The racial composition of the population was 70.3% white, 13.3% black or African American, 0.3% Native American, 0.6% Asian, 13.4% from some other race and 2.1% from two or more races. 23.2% of the population was Hispanic or Latino of any race.

=== 2000 census ===
As of the census of 2000, there were 8,033 people, 2,860 households, and 2,053 families residing in the city. The population density was 229.2 inhabitants per square mile (88.5/km^{2}). There were 3,187 housing units at an average density of 90.9 per square mile (35.1/km^{2}). The racial makeup of the city was 75.54% White, 13.11% African American, 0.40% Native American, 0.68% Asian, 0.01% Pacific Islander, 9.25% from other races, and 1.01% from two or more races. Hispanic or Latino of any race were 14.83% of the population.

There were 2,860 households, out of which 35.8% had children under the age of 18 living with them, 54.9% were married couples living together, 12.7% had a female householder with no husband present, and 28.2% were non-families. 25.0% of all households were made up of individuals, and 12.1% had someone living alone who was 65 years of age or older. The average household size was 2.65 and the average family size was 3.16.

In the city, the population was spread out, with 27.1% under the age of 18, 9.4% from 18 to 24, 27.8% from 25 to 44, 21.5% from 45 to 64, and 14.3% who were 65 years of age or older. The median age was 35 years. For every 100 females, there were 97.3 males. For every 100 females age 18 and over, there were 95.4 males.

The median income for a household in the city was $36,325, and the median income for a family was $41,369. Males had a median income of $33,013 versus $24,688 for females. The per capita income for the city was $16,635. About 12.4% of families and 13.2% of the population were below the poverty line, including 15.7% of those under age 18 and 11.8% of those age 65 or over.

== Education ==
The city of Liberty is served by the Liberty Independent School District. All residents are zoned to San Jacinto Elementary School, Liberty Elementary School, Liberty Middle School, and Liberty High School.

Dusty McGee is the Superintendent of Schools.

Residents of Liberty ISD are zoned to Lee College.

=== Public libraries ===
The 43,000 volume Liberty Municipal Library is located in the Geraldine D. Humphreys Cultural Center in Liberty. The Geraldine D. Humphreys Cultural Center, including the Humphreys-Burson Theatre which is home to the Valley Players theatrical company, was renovated in a major multimillion-dollar remodeling completed in 2010. The project has doubled the size of the municipal library serving Liberty, Texas and southeastern Liberty County.

The Sam Houston Regional Library and Research Center, operated by the Texas State Library and Archives Commission is located 3 miles (4.8 km) north of Liberty in an unincorporated area. Judge and Mrs. Price Daniel donated 114 acres (46 ha) of land for the purpose of establishing a library on September 27, 1973. Construction began in the fall of 1975; by then $700,000 had been raised through private donations. The library opened on May 14, 1977. Archives and displays show development of region, artifacts, furniture, Jean Lafitte's journals, and 1826 census. It also contains the Texana collection of former Governor Price Daniel.

== Transportation ==
Liberty Municipal Airport, a general aviation airport is located approximately 6 miles east of Liberty, just north of the intersection of FM 160 east with FM 2830. The runway is 3,801 ft. long and is oriented 16 – 34 ( 160 degrees – 340 degrees ). The Liberty Municipal Airport has a pilot courtesy room and fueling facilities with 100LL and Jet-A available. A new set of T-Hangars were completed with room for more in the future. Other major renovations and technology improvements are in progress. A runway extension is planned for the near future. The city provides a courtesy car for transient pilots. Pilots are encourage to check it availability prior to arrival.

Liberty has public transportation service provided by the Brazos Transit District. The city shares a circulator bus route with the adjacent city of Dayton, Texas.

== Parks and recreation ==
The Park Theater was constructed and opened in 1938. This movie house entertained people for years before closing its doors. The theatre sat idle, then in 1993, the John W. Cox family purchased the theater and refurbished the building, reopening it as The Liberty Opry; a live, Branson-style musical entertainment venue. The theater seats 400 and has a building adjoined to the theater with restroom facilities, office, dressing rooms to accommodate the entertainers, and a concession area, which seats 80. The owners have changed over the years. In 2006 John W. Cox sold it to Bruce Boehner, who owned it until he sold it in 2010 to Jay and Nina Cantu who provided weekly shows ranging from Country to Gospel to Rock & Roll every Saturday 4:00 pm. However, as of January 26, 2018, performances have decreased to an average of two shows per month.

The Geraldine D. Humphreys Cultural Center, a 23,000 square feet (2,100 m^{2}) municipal facility, houses the Liberty Municipal Library and the 153 seat Humphreys-Burson Theatre. The Geraldine D. Humphreys Cultural Center opened and was dedicated on October 18, 1970. The Geraldine D. Humphrey's Cultural Center has undergone a multimillion-dollar renovation project completed in 2010, including renovation of the Humphreys-Burson Theater adding new seating, expanded storage space and new carpeting.

== Media ==
- The Liberty Vindicator – Serving Liberty and Liberty County since 1887.
- The Liberty Gazette – Liberty County's only home-owned Newspaper since 1960
- Bluebonnet News - News source for all of Liberty County and surrounding areas

== Notable people ==
- Bill Daniel, Governor of Guam, member of Texas House of Representatives
- Vara Martin Daniel, Educator, First Lady of Guam
- Marion Price Daniel, Sr., 38th governor of Texas, US senator
- Bill Dodd, Louisiana politician
- Bobby Seale, co-founder of the Black Panther Party

== Sources ==
- Henson, Margaret Swett (1982), Juan Davis Bradburn: A Reappraisal of the Mexican Commander of Anahuac, College Station, TX: Texas A&M University Press, ISBN 978-0-89096-135-3
