= Timeline of the 1989 Pacific hurricane season =

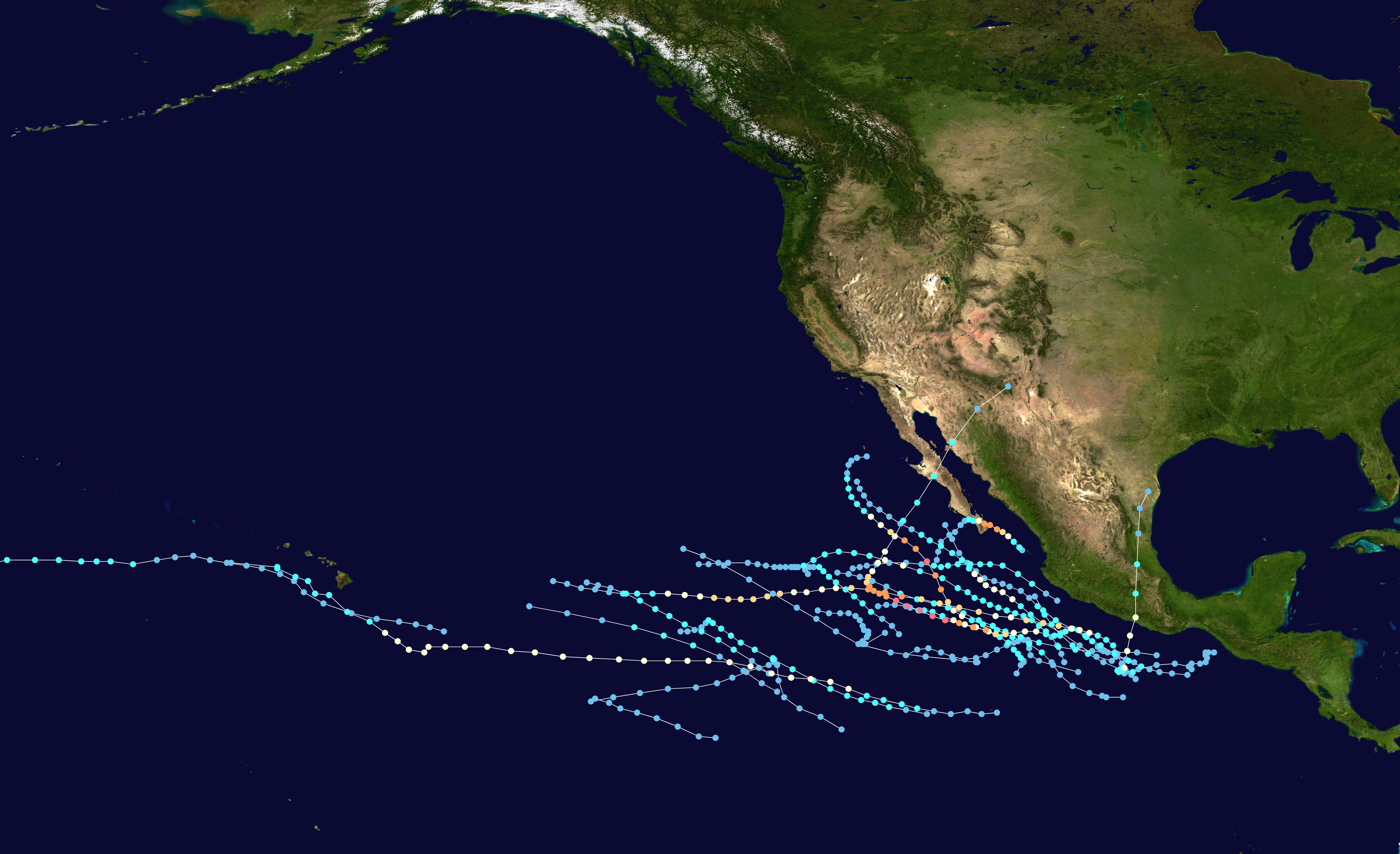
- Season summary map

Season boundaries
- First system formed: January 9, 1989
- Last system dissipated: October 19, 1989

Strongest system
- Name: Raymond
- Maximum winds: 145 mph (230 km/h) (1-minute sustained)
- Lowest pressure: 935 mbar (hPa; 27.61 inHg)

Longest lasting system
- Name: Ismael
- Duration: 11.25 days
Storm articles
- Hurricane Cosme (1989)
- Hurricane Dalilia
- Hurricane Kiko (1989)
- Hurricane Raymond (1989)

The 1989 Pacific hurricane season was the annual cycle of tropical cyclone formation over the Pacific Ocean north of the equator and east of the International Date Line (IDL). The season officially began on May 15 in the Eastern Pacific basin proper (east of 140°W) and June 1 in the Central Pacific basin (140°W to the IDL), and ended on November 30 in both areas. This is historically the period during which most tropical cyclogenesis occurs in these respective areas. However, tropical cyclones can form at any time of the year, as demonstrated by the development of Tropical Storm Winona on January 9, more than four months before the official start of the season. Activity ceased on October 19 with the dissipation of Tropical Depression Twenty Four-E.

Activity during the 1989 season was generally near average. (Note: During the period from 1981 to 2010, an average Pacific hurricane season generated 15.4 tropical storms, 8.4 hurricanes, and 3.9 major hurricanes.) A total of 18 named tropical storms formed, nine of which strengthened into hurricanes. Four storms became major hurricanes by reaching Category 3 or higher on the five-level Saffir–Simpson scale. There were also seven tropical depressions which remained below tropical storm status. While Winona was the only tropical cyclone to form in the Central Pacific basin in 1989, several tropical depressions and Hurricane Dalilia entered the region by crossing 140°W from the east.

Three tropical cyclones made landfall this season, all in Mexico. Hurricane Cosme struck Guerrero at Category 1 strength in June. Heavy rainfall precipitated severe floods that killed at least 30 people. In late August, the compact yet powerful Hurricane Kiko came ashore in southern Baja California Sur as a Category 3 major hurricane, though little impact was reported in comparison to Kiko's intensity. After greatly weakening from its Category 4 peak intensity, Hurricane Raymond raced across northwestern Mexico in early October, in the process making two landfalls as a tropical storm: first in Baja California Sur, then in Sonora.

This timeline documents tropical cyclone formations, strengthening, weakening, landfalls, extratropical transitions, and dissipations during the season. It includes information that was not released during the season, meaning that data from post-storm reviews by the National Hurricane Center (NHC) and the Central Pacific Hurricane Center (CPHC), including a storm which was not operationally warned upon, has been included.

The time stamp for each event is first stated using Coordinated Universal Time (UTC), the 24-hour clock where 00:00 = midnight UTC. The NHC uses both UTC and the time zone where the center of the tropical cyclone was then located. Prior to 2015, two time zones were utilized in the Eastern Pacific basin: Pacific for the Eastern Pacific, and Hawaii−Aleutian for the Central Pacific. In this timeline, the respective area time is included in parentheses. Additionally, figures for maximum sustained winds and position estimates are rounded to the nearest 5 units (miles, or kilometers), following NHC practice. Direct wind observations are rounded to the nearest whole number. Atmospheric pressures are listed to the nearest millibar and nearest hundredth of an inch of mercury.

== Timeline of events ==
=== January ===
January 9

- 12:00 UTC (2:00 a.m. HST) at 15.9°N 148.3°W – An off-season tropical cyclone, Tropical Depression 01W, (Note: Tropical Depression 01W—future Tropical Storm Winona—was not operationally recognized as a tropical cyclone until January 16, when the Joint Typhoon Warning Center (JTWC) began issuing warnings on the system, which by then had crossed the International Date Line (IDL) into the Western Pacific basin.) develops from an area of unsettled weather while located about 725 mi (1,165 km) east-southeast of Honolulu, Hawaii.

January 13

- 18:00 UTC (8:00 a.m. HST) at 20.7°N 170.5°W – Tropical Depression 01W strengthens into Tropical Storm Winona (Note: Winona was named by the JTWC, as it was not operationally warned upon by the Central Pacific Hurricane Center (CPHC).) while located about 715 mi (1,150 km) west of the Hawaiian island of Kauaʻi.

January 14

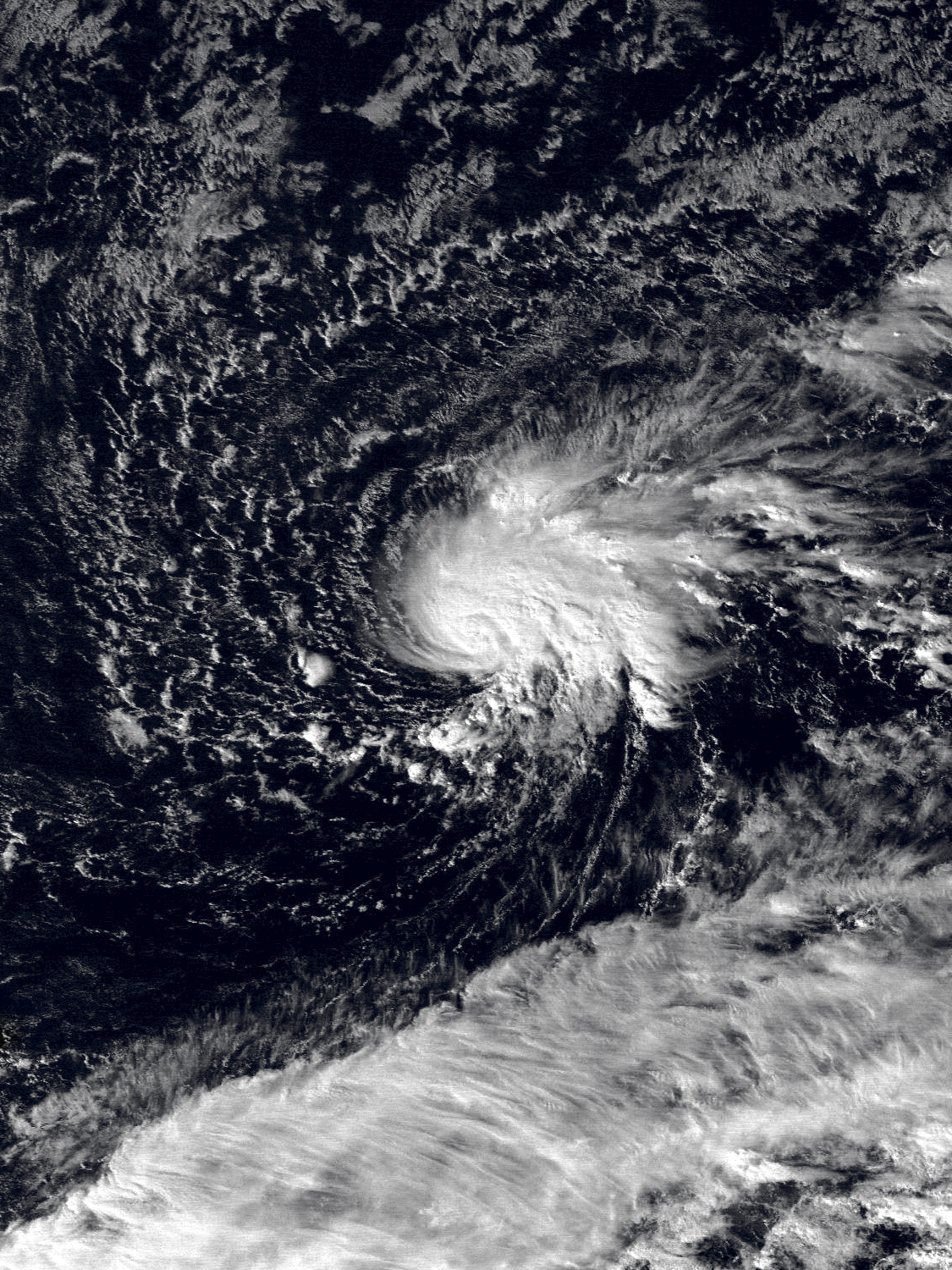
Tropical Storm Winona early on January 14

- 00:00 UTC (2:00 p.m. HST, January 13) at 20.9°N 172.1°W – Tropical Storm Winona attains maximum sustained winds of 45 mph (75 km/h)—its highest while in the Central Pacific basin—accompanied by an unknown central pressure while located about 810 mi (1,305 km) west of Kauaʻi.

January 15

- 12:00 UTC (2:00 a.m. HST) at 20.7°N 178.6°E – Tropical Storm Winona crosses the International Date Line (IDL) into the Western Pacific basin while located about 785 mi (1,260 km) east of Wake Island, thereby becoming part of the annual typhoon season.

=== May ===
May 15

- The 1989 Eastern Pacific hurricane season officially begins.

May 31

- 18:00 UTC (11:00 a.m. PDT) at 10.0°N 113.8°W – Tropical Depression One-E develops from an area of unsettled weather while located about 925 mi (1,490 km) south-southwest of the southern tip of the Baja California peninsula.

=== June ===
June 1

- The 1989 Central Pacific hurricane season officially begins.
- 06:00 UTC (11:00 p.m. PDT, May 31) at 10.5°N 116.5°W – Tropical Depression One-E strengthens into Tropical Storm Adolph while located about 955 mi (1,540 km) south-southwest of the southern tip of the Baja California peninsula.

June 2

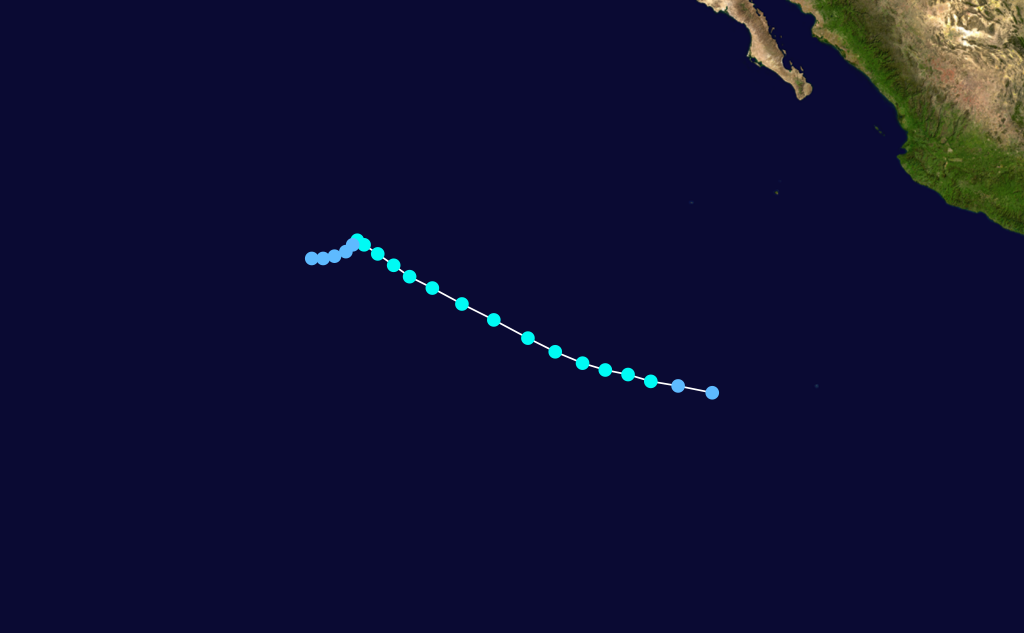
Storm track of Tropical Storm Adolph

- 00:00 UTC (5:00 p.m. PDT, June 1) at 11.3°N 119.5°W – Tropical Storm Adolph attains its peak intensity, with maximum sustained winds of 65 mph (100 km/h) and a minimum central pressure of 994 mbar (29.35 inHg), while located about 1,020 mi (1,640 km) southwest of the southern tip of the Baja California peninsula.

June 4

- 18:00 UTC (11:00 a.m. PDT) at 16.5°N 129.6°W – Tropical Storm Adolph weakens into a tropical depression while located about 1,345 mi (2,170 km) west-southwest of the southern tip of the Baja California peninsula.

June 5

- 18:00 UTC (11:00 a.m. PDT) at 15.9°N 131.4°W – Tropical Depression Adolph is last noted as a tropical cyclone while located about 1,475 mi (2,370 km) west-southwest of the southern tip of the Baja California peninsula, dissipating shortly thereafter.

June 15

- 18:00 UTC (11:00 a.m. PDT) at 12.9°N 107.4°W – Tropical Depression Two-E develops from a tropical wave while located about 570 mi (915 km) west-southwest of Acapulco, Guerrero.

June 16

- 18:00 UTC (11:00 a.m. PDT) at 14.0°N 107.1°W – Tropical Depression Two-E strengthens into Tropical Storm Barbara while located about 520 mi (835 km) west-southwest of Acapulco.

June 18

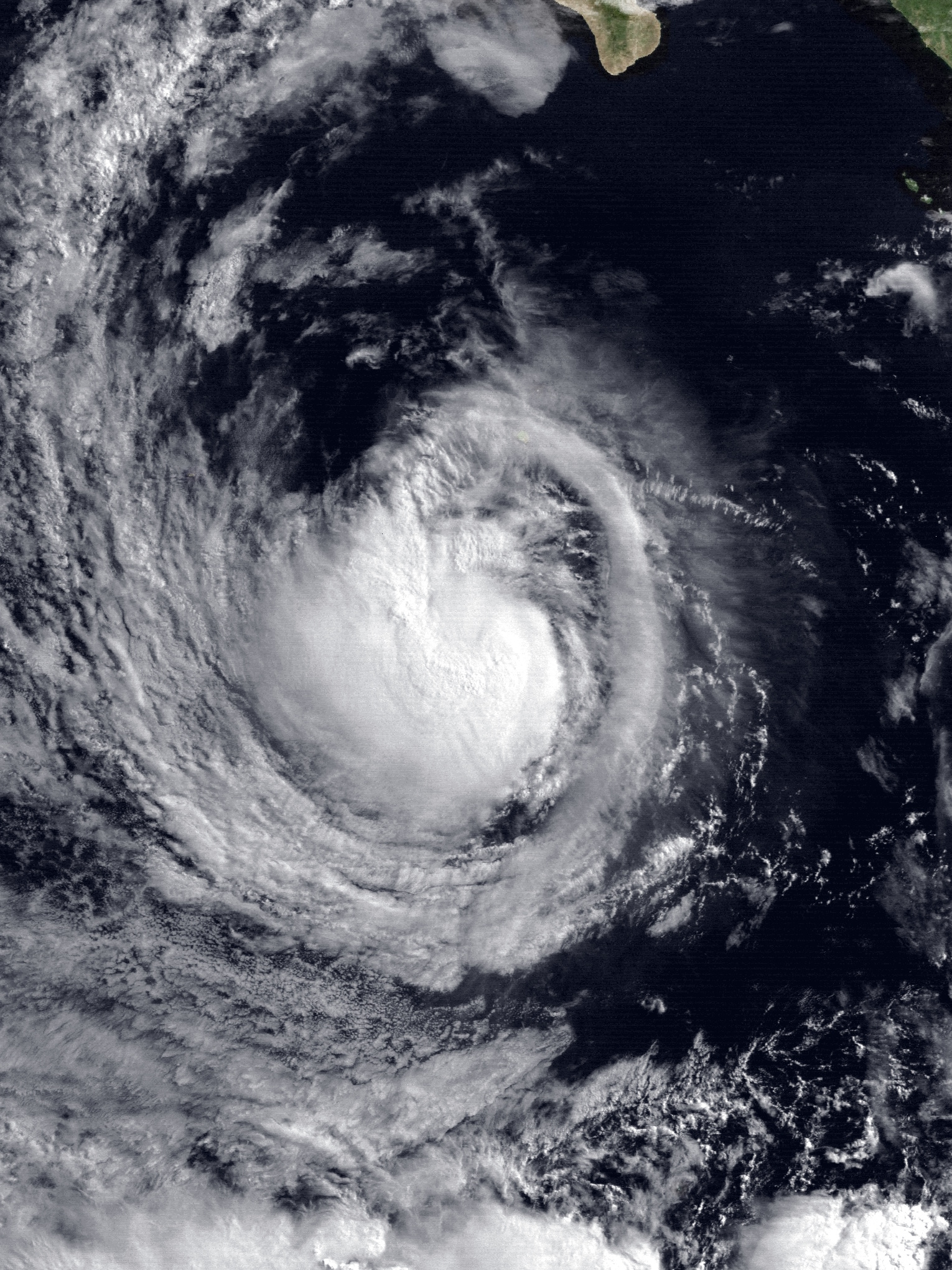
Hurricane Barbara near peak intensity on June 18

- 00:00 UTC (5:00 p.m. PDT, June 17) at 15.9°N 109.4°W – Tropical Storm Barbara strengthens into a Category 1 hurricane on the Saffir–Simpson scale while located about 485 mi (780 km) south of the southern tip of the Baja California peninsula.
- 06:00 UTC (11:00 p.m. PDT, June 17) at 16.2°N 110.3°W – Hurricane Barbara attains its peak intensity, with maximum sustained winds of 80 mph (130 km/h) and a minimum central pressure of 984 mbar (29.06 inHg), while located about 460 mi (740 km) south of the southern tip of the Baja California peninsula.
- 18:00 UTC (11:00 a.m. PDT) at 13.5°N 97.4°W – Tropical Depression Three-E develops from a tropical wave while located about 290 mi (465 km) southeast of Acapulco.

June 19

- 00:00 UTC (5:00 p.m. PDT, June 18) at 17.0°N 112.7°W – Hurricane Barbara weakens into a tropical storm while located about 445 mi (715 km) south-southwest of the southern tip of the Baja California peninsula.

June 20

- 00:00 UTC (5:00 p.m. PDT, June 19) at 17.6°N 115.0°W – Tropical Storm Barbara weakens into a tropical depression while located about 490 mi (790 km) southwest of the southern tip of the Baja California peninsula.
- 00:00 UTC (5:00 p.m. PDT, June 19) at 13.0°N 99.1°W – Tropical Depression Three-E strengthens into Tropical Storm Cosme while located about 270 mi (435 km) south of Acapulco.

June 21

- 00:00 UTC (5:00 p.m. PDT, June 20) at 17.7°N 117.3°W – Tropical Depression Barbara is last noted as a tropical cyclone while located about 595 mi (955 km) southwest of the southern tip of the Baja California peninsula, dissipating shortly thereafter.
- 12:00 UTC (5:00 a.m. PDT) at 13.3°N 99.7°W – Tropical Storm Cosme strengthens into a Category 1 hurricane while located about 245 mi (400 km) south of Acapulco.

June 22

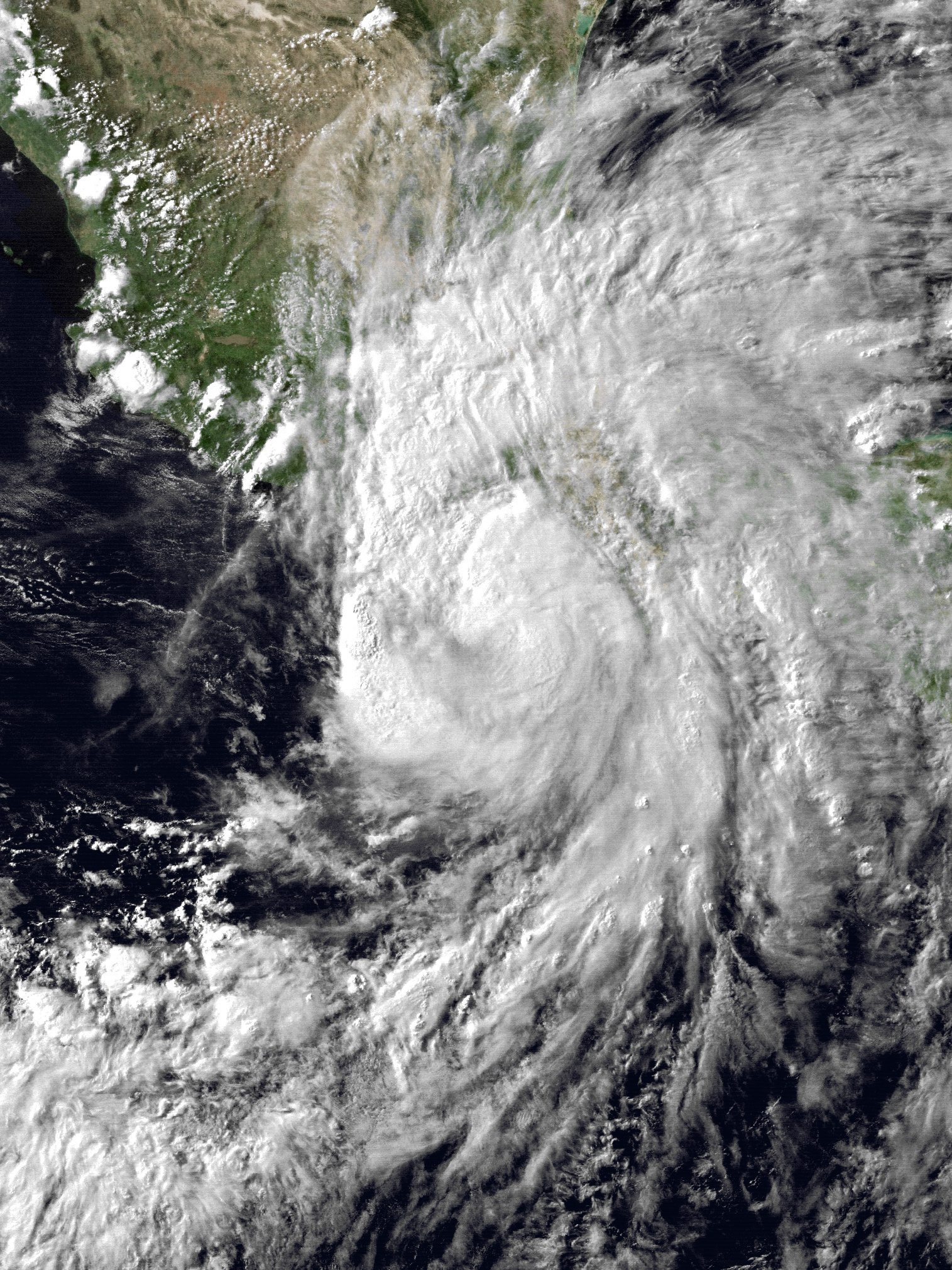
Hurricane Cosme shortly before peak intensity late on June 21

- 00:00 UTC (5:00 p.m. PDT, June 21) at 15.6°N 99.3°W – Hurricane Cosme attains its peak intensity, with maximum sustained winds of 85 mph (140 km/h) and a minimum central pressure of 979 mbar (28.91 inHg).
- 04:00 UTC (9:00 p.m. PDT, June 21) at 16.8°N 99.0°W – Hurricane Cosme makes landfall about 60 mi (95 km) east of Acapulco with maximum sustained winds of 80 mph (130 km/h) and a central pressure of 980 mbar (28.94 inHg).
- 12:00 UTC (5:00 a.m. PDT) at 18.6°N 98.9°W – Hurricane Cosme weakens into a tropical storm over land while located about 140 mi (220 km/h) north-northeast of Acapulco.

June 23

- 00:00 UTC (5:00 p.m. PDT, June 22) at 22.9°N 98.7°W – Tropical Storm Cosme weakens into a tropical depression over land while located about 225 mi (360 km) south-southwest of Brownsville, Texas.
- 12:00 UTC (5:00 a.m. PDT) at 25.9°N 98.0°W – Tropical Depression Cosme is last noted as a tropical cyclone over land while located about 35 mi (55 km) west of Brownsville, dissipating shortly thereafter.

=== July ===
July 9

- 00:00 UTC (5:00 p.m. PDT, July 8) at 8.3°N 128.9°W – Tropical Depression Four-E develops from an area of unsettled weather while located about 1,610 mi (2,595 km) southwest of the southern tip of the Baja California peninsula.
- 00:00 UTC (5:00 p.m. PDT, July 8) at 8.9°N 119.9°W – Tropical Depression Five-E develops from an area of unsettled weather while located about 1,170 mi (1,880 km) southwest of the southern tip of the Baja California peninsula.
- 18:00 UTC (11:00 a.m. PDT) at 9.7°N 133.1°W – Tropical Depression Four-E attains its peak intensity, with maximum sustained winds of 35 mph (55 km/h) and an unknown central pressure, while located about 1,780 mi (2,865 km) west-southwest of the southern tip of the Baja California peninsula.

July 10

- 00:00 UTC (5:00 p.m. PDT, July 9) at 12.4°N 124.4°W – Tropical Depression Five-E attains its peak intensity, with maximum sustained winds of 35 mph (55 km/h) and an unknown central pressure, while located about 1,190 mi (1,920 km) southwest of the southern tip of the Baja California peninsula.

July 11

- 12:00 UTC (2:00 a.m. HST) at 12.5°N 140.0°W – Tropical Depression Four-E crosses 140°W into the Central Pacific basin while located about 1,135 mi (1,825 km) east-southeast of South Point, Hawaii. (Note: The Northeast and North Central Pacific hurricane database (HURDAT) terminates Tropical Depression Four-E before it reaches the Central Pacific basin: 18:00 UTC (11:00 a.m. PDT) on July 10, at 11.1°N 137.5°W.)
- 12:00 UTC (5:00 a.m. PDT) at 10.1°N 108.8°W – Tropical Depression Six-E develops from an Intertropical Convergence Zone (ITCZ) disturbance while located about 885 mi (1,425 km) south of the southern tip of the Baja California peninsula.

July 12

- 18:00 UTC (11:00 a.m. PDT) at 10.4°N 114.5°W – Tropical Depression Six-E strengthens into Tropical Storm Dalilia while located about 910 mi (1,465 km) south-southwest of the southern tip of the Baja California peninsula.

July 13

- 06:00 UTC (11:00 p.m. PDT, July 12) at 11.5°N 134.3°W – After weakening slightly, Tropical Depression Five-E reattains its peak intensity while located about 1,785 mi (2,870 km) west-southwest of the southern tip of the Baja California peninsula.
- 18:00 UTC (8:00 a.m. HST) at 15.7°N 153.2°W – Tropical Depression Four-E is last noted as a tropical cyclone while located about 275 mi (445 km) southeast of South Point, dissipating shortly thereafter.
- 18:00 UTC (11:00 a.m. PDT) at 11.8°N 119.4°W – Tropical Storm Dalilia strengthens into a Category 1 hurricane while located about 985 mi (1,585 km) southwest of the southern tip of the Baja California peninsula.

July 14

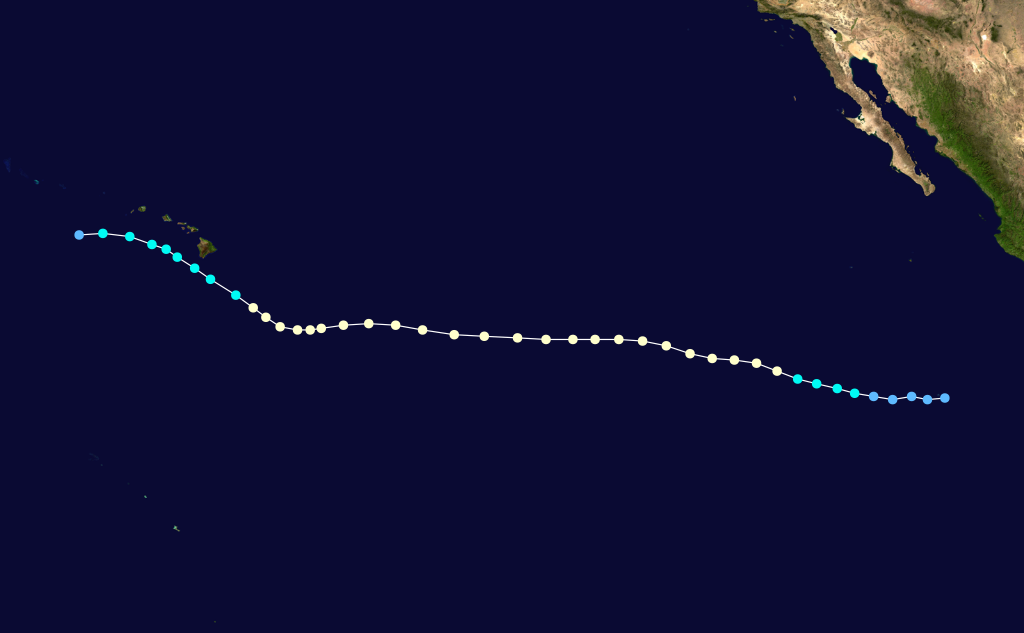
Storm track of Hurricane Dalilia

- 00:00 UTC (2:00 p.m. HST, July 13) at 10.0°N 141.0°W – Tropical Depression Five-E crosses 140°W into the Central Pacific basin while located about 1,155 mi (1,860 km) east-southeast of South Point. (Note: HURDAT terminates Tropical Depression Five-E before it reaches the Central Pacific basin: 18:00 UTC (11:00 a.m. PDT) on July 13, at 10.9°N 137.8°W.)
- 18:00 UTC (8:00 a.m. HST) at 9.4°N 147.0°W – Tropical Depression Five-E is last noted as a tropical cyclone while located about 875 mi (1,410 km) southeast of South Point, dissipating shortly thereafter.

July 15

- 00:00 UTC (5:00 p.m. PDT, July 14) at 13.7°N 110.2°W – Tropical Depression Seven-E develops from an area of unsettled weather while located about 635 mi (1,020 km) south of the southern tip of the Baja California peninsula.

July 16

- 12:00 UTC (5:00 a.m. PDT) at 15.9°N 120.3°W – Tropical Depression Seven-E attains its peak intensity, with maximum sustained winds of 35 mph (55 km/h) and an unknown central pressure, while located about 830 mi (1,335 km) southwest of the southern tip of the Baja California peninsula.
- 18:00 UTC (11:00 a.m. PDT) at 14.0°N 137.9°W – Hurricane Dalilia attains its peak intensity, with maximum sustained winds of 90 mph (150 km/h) and a minimum central pressure of 977 mbar (28.85 inHg), while located about 1,930 mi (3,105 km) west-southwest of the southern tip of the Baja California peninsula.

July 17

- 06:00 UTC (8:00 p.m. HST, July 16) at 14.4°N 141.8°W – Hurricane Dalilia crosses 140°W into the Central Pacific basin while located about 965 mi (1,555 km) east-southeast of South Point.

July 18

- 06:00 UTC (11:00 p.m. PDT, July 17) at 21.8°N 131.2°W – Tropical Depression Seven-E is last noted as a tropical cyclone while located about 1,360 mi (2,185 km) west of the southern tip of the Baja California peninsula, dissipating shortly thereafter.

July 19

- 00:00 UTC (5:00 p.m. PDT, July 18) at 11.6°N 124.5°W – Tropical Depression Eight-E develops from an ITCZ disturbance while located about 1,235 mi (1,990 km) southwest of the southern tip of the Baja California peninsula.
- 18:00 UTC (8:00 a.m. HST) at 16.6°N 153.6°W – Hurricane Dalilia weakens into a tropical storm while located about 215 mi (345 km) southeast of South Point.

July 20

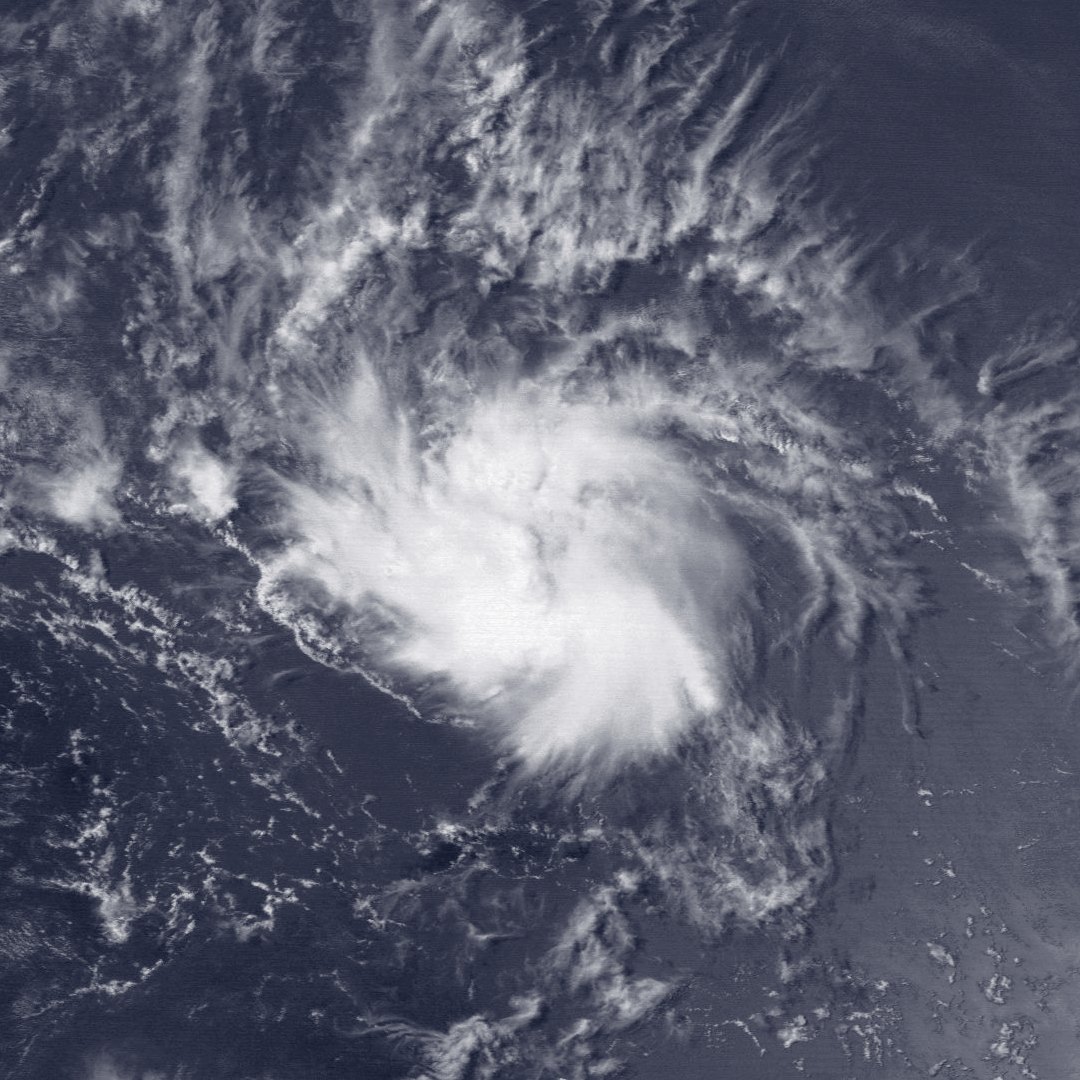
Tropical Depression Eight-E late on July 19, shortly before becoming a tropical storm and receiving the name Erick

- 00:00 UTC (5:00 p.m. PDT, July 19) at 14.9°N 130.5°W – Tropical Depression Eight-E strengthens into Tropical Storm Erick while located about 1,450 mi (2,335 km) west-southwest of the southern tip of the Baja California peninsula.
- 06:00 UTC (11:00 p.m. PDT, July 19) at 15.6°N 132.6°W – Tropical Storm Erick attains its peak intensity, with maximum sustained winds of 40 mph (65 km/h) and a minimum central pressure of 1005 mbar (29.68 inHg), while located about 1,560 mi (2,510 km) west-southwest of the southern tip of the Baja California peninsula.
- 18:00 UTC (11:00 a.m. PDT) at 16.7°N 137.0°W – Tropical Storm Erick weakens into a tropical depression while located about 1,805 mi (2,910 km) west-southwest of the southern tip of the Baja California peninsula.

July 21

- 06:00 UTC (8:00 p.m. HST, July 20) at 17.7°N 142.2°W – Tropical Depression Erick crosses 140°W into the Central Pacific basin while located about 2,110 mi (3,400 km) west of the southern tip of the Baja California peninsula, dissipating shortly thereafter.
- 18:00 UTC (8:00 a.m. HST) at 20.4°N 163.5°W – Tropical Storm Dalilia weakens into a tropical depression while located about 235 mi (380 km) west-southwest of Niʻihau, dissipating shortly thereafter.

July 23

- 18:00 UTC (11:00 a.m. PDT) at 13.2°N 100.0°W – Tropical Depression Nine-E develops from a tropical wave while located about 255 mi (410 km) south of Acapulco.

July 24

- 06:00 UTC (11:00 p.m. PDT, July 23) at 14.3°N 102.3°W – Tropical Depression Nine-E strengthens into Tropical Storm Flossie while located about 240 mi (390 km) southwest of Acapulco.
- 18:00 UTC (11:00 a.m. PDT) at 15.7°N 104.3°W – Tropical Storm Flossie attains its peak intensity, with maximum sustained winds of 40 mph (65 km/h) and a minimum central pressure of 1004 mbar (29.65 inHg), while located about 305 mi (490 km) west-southwest of Acapulco.

July 25

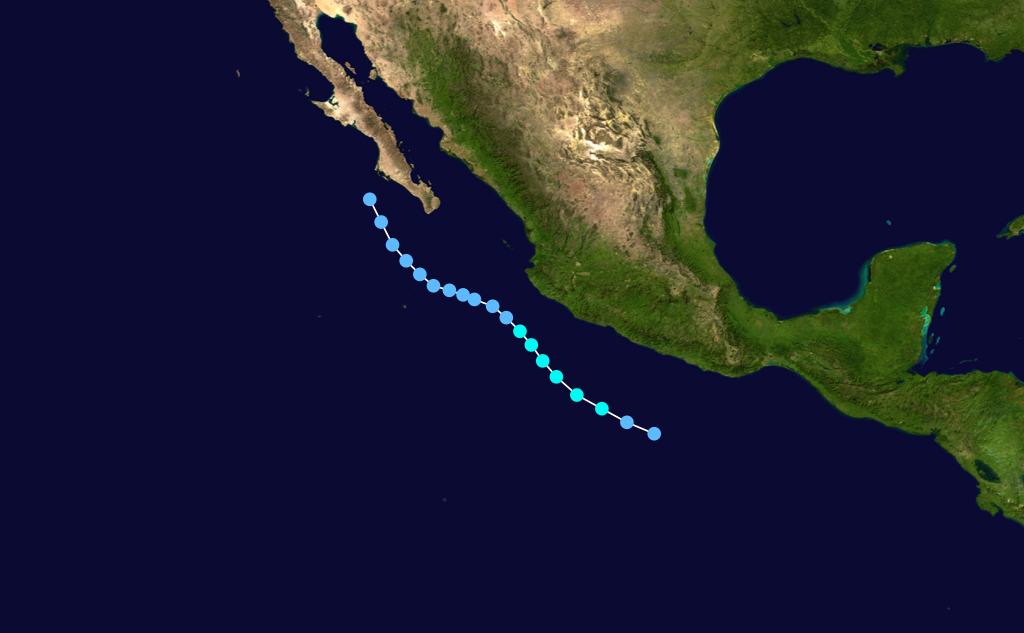
Storm track of Tropical Storm Flossie

- 18:00 UTC (11:00 a.m. PDT) at 18.3°N 106.5°W – Tropical Storm Flossie weakens into a tropical depression while located about 185 mi (295 km) south-southwest of Puerto Vallarta, Jalisco.

July 28

- 06:00 UTC (11:00 p.m. PDT, July 27) at 23.5°N 112.5°W – Tropical Depression Flossie is last noted as a tropical cyclone while located about 165 mi (270 km) west-northwest of the southern tip of the Baja California peninsula, dissipating shortly thereafter.

July 30

- 00:00 UTC (5:00 p.m. PDT, July 29) at 13.8°N 100.6°W – Tropical Depression Ten-E develops from an area of unsettled weather while located about 220 mi (350 km) south-southwest of Acapulco.

July 31

- 00:00 UTC (5:00 p.m. PDT, July 30) at 16.5°N 105.5°W – Tropical Depression Ten-E strengthens into Tropical Storm Gil while located about 375 mi (600 km) west of Acapulco.
- 18:00 UTC (11:00 a.m. PDT) at 18.2°N 107.7°W – Tropical Storm Gil strengthens into a Category 1 hurricane while located about 220 mi (350 km) east of Socorro Island.

=== August ===
August 1

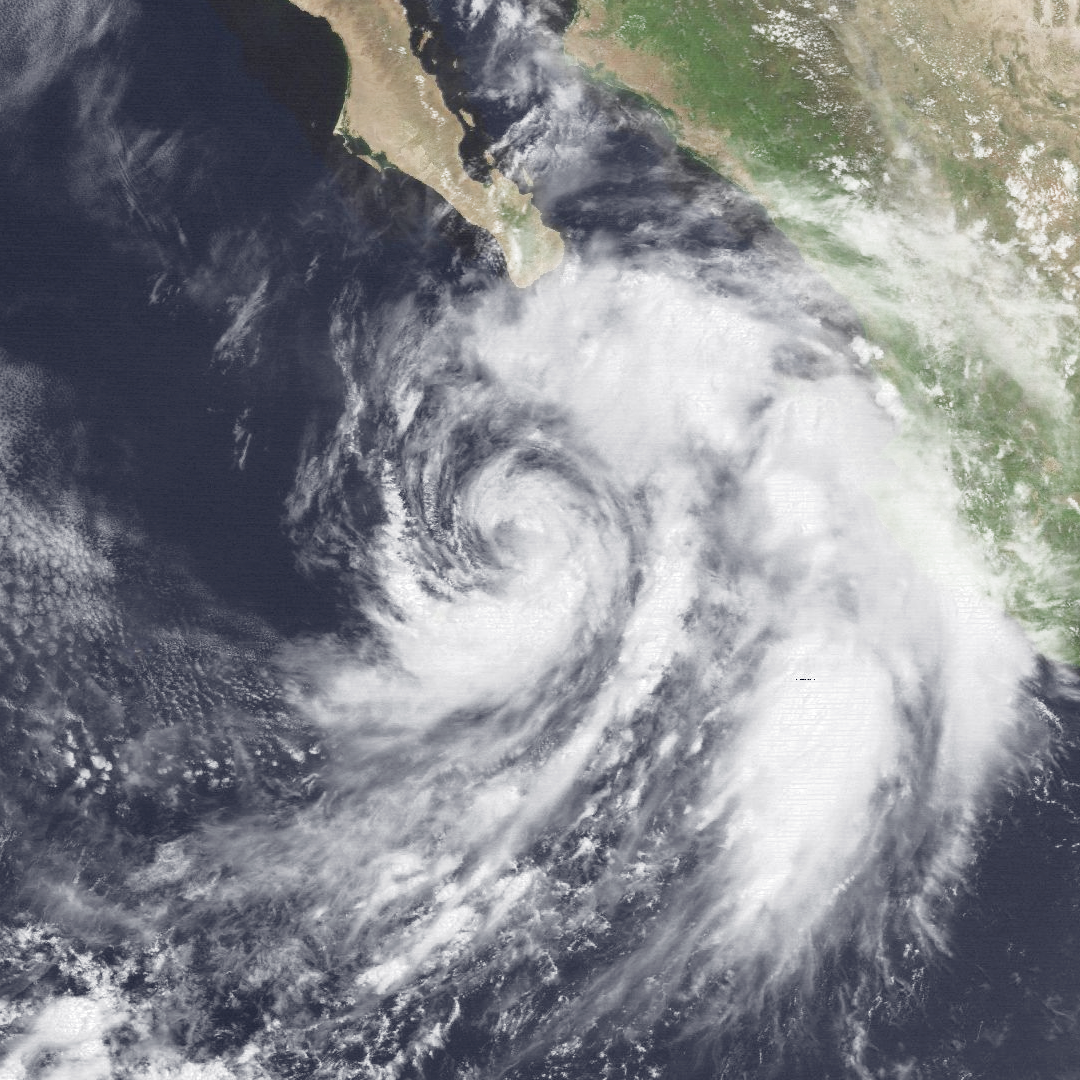
Hurricane Gil beginning to weaken on August 1

- 06:00 UTC (11:00 p.m. PDT, July 31) at 18.9°N 109.0°W – Hurricane Gil attains its peak intensity, with maximum sustained winds of 85 mph (140 km/h) and a minimum central pressure of 979 mbar (28.91 inHg), while located about 125 mi (205 km) east of Socorro Island.

August 2

- 06:00 UTC (11:00 p.m. PDT, August 1) at 20.4°N 110.8°W – Hurricane Gil weakens into a tropical storm while located about 110 mi (175 km) north of Socorro Island.

August 3

- 18:00 UTC (11:00 a.m. PDT) at 23.2°N 114.9°W – Tropical Storm Gil weakens into a tropical depression while located about 315 mi (510 km) west of the southern tip of the Baja California peninsula.

August 5

- 12:00 UTC (5:00 a.m. PDT) at 26.6°N 118.8°W – Tropical Depression Gil is last noted as a tropical cyclone while located about 240 mi (390 km) west-southwest of Punta Eugenia, Baja California Sur, dissipating shortly thereafter.

August 14

- 12:00 UTC (5:00 a.m. PDT) at 12.5°N 98.9°W – Tropical Depression Eleven-E develops from a tropical wave while located about 310 mi (500 km) south of Acapulco.

August 15

- 00:00 UTC (5:00 p.m. PDT, August 14) at 12.9°N 125.1°W – Tropical Depression Twelve-E develops from a tropical wave while located about 1,210 mi (1,945 km) southwest of the southern tip of the Baja California peninsula.
- 12:00 UTC (5:00 a.m. PDT) at 14.6°N 127.6°W – Tropical Depression Twelve-E strengthens into Tropical Storm Henriette while located about 1,285 mi (2,065 km) west-southwest of the southern tip of the Baja California peninsula.
- 18:00 UTC (11:00 a.m. PDT) at 14.9°N 100.5°W – Tropical Depression Eleven-E strengthens into Tropical Storm Ismael while located about 145 mi (230 km) south-southwest of Acapulco.

August 16

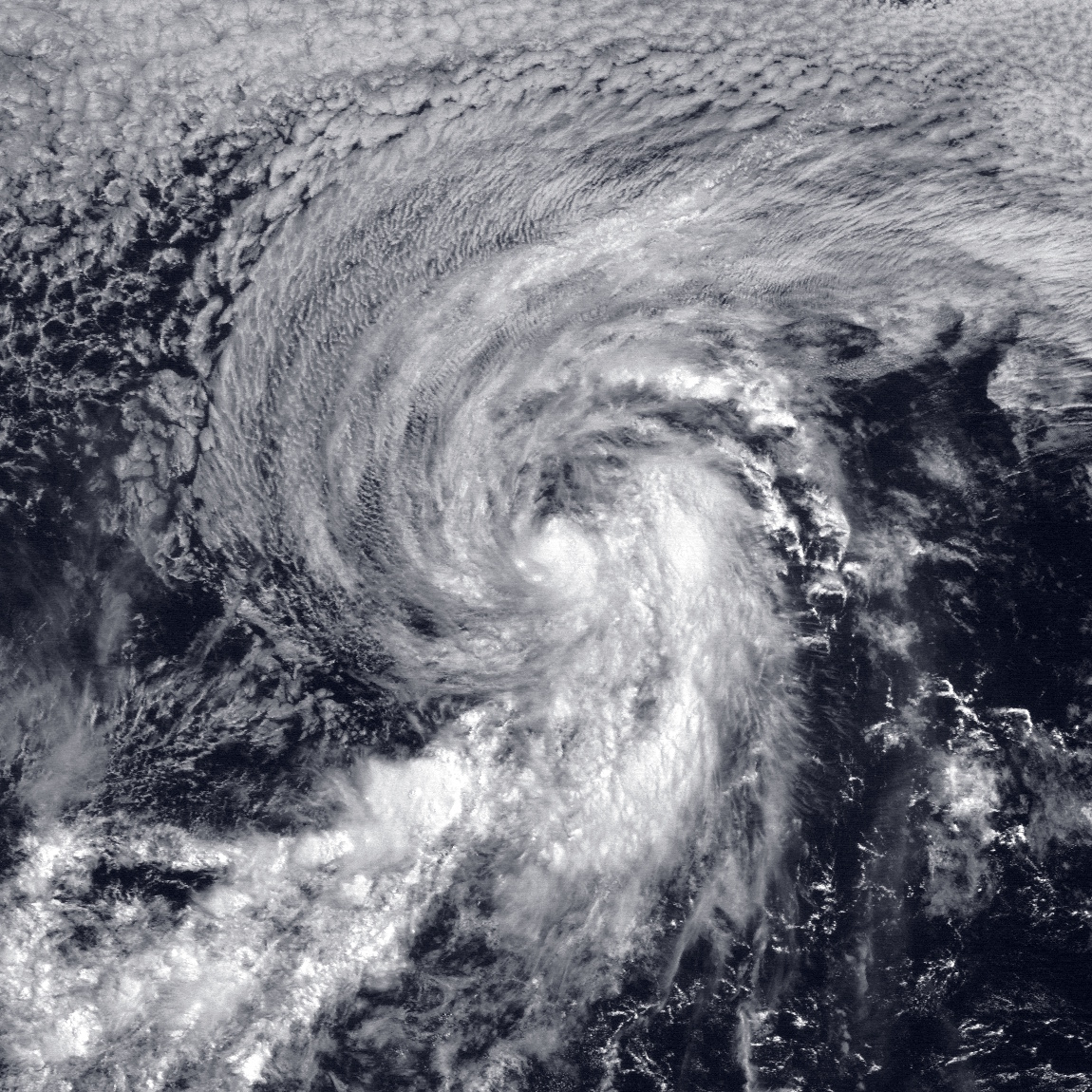
Tropical Storm Henriette near peak intensity late on August 16

- 12:00 UTC (5:00 a.m. PDT) at 15.8°N 102.2°W – Tropical Storm Ismael strengthens into a Category 1 hurricane while located about 175 mi (280 km) west-southwest of Acapulco.
- 12:00 UTC (5:00 a.m. PDT) at 17.0°N 132.2°W – Tropical Storm Henriette attains its peak intensity, with maximum sustained winds of 50 mph (85 km/h) and a minimum central pressure of 1000 mbar (29.53 inHg), while located about 1,495 mi (2,410 km) west-southwest of the southern tip of the Baja California peninsula.

August 17

- 06:00 UTC (11:00 p.m. PDT, August 16) at 16.3°N 104.4°W – Hurricane Ismael strengthens to Category 2 intensity while located about 190 mi (305 km) south of Manzanillo.
- 12:00 UTC (5:00 a.m. PDT) at 19.0°N 136.4°W – Tropical Storm Henriette weakens into a tropical depression while located about 1,725 mi (2,780 km) west of the southern tip of the Baja California peninsula.

August 18

- 00:00 UTC (5:00 p.m. PDT, August 17) at 16.9°N 107.8°W – Hurricane Ismael weakens to Category 1 intensity while located about 270 mi (435 km) southwest of Manzanillo.
- 00:00 UTC (5:00 p.m. PDT, August 17) at 19.4°N 138.1°W – Tropical Depression Henriette is last noted as a tropical cyclone while located about 1,825 mi (2,935 km) west of the southern tip of the Baja California peninsula, dissipating shortly thereafter.
- 12:00 UTC (5:00 a.m. PDT) at 17.3°N 110.1°W – Hurricane Ismael restrengthens to Category 2 intensity while located about 385 mi (620 km) south of the southern tip of the Baja California peninsula.

August 19

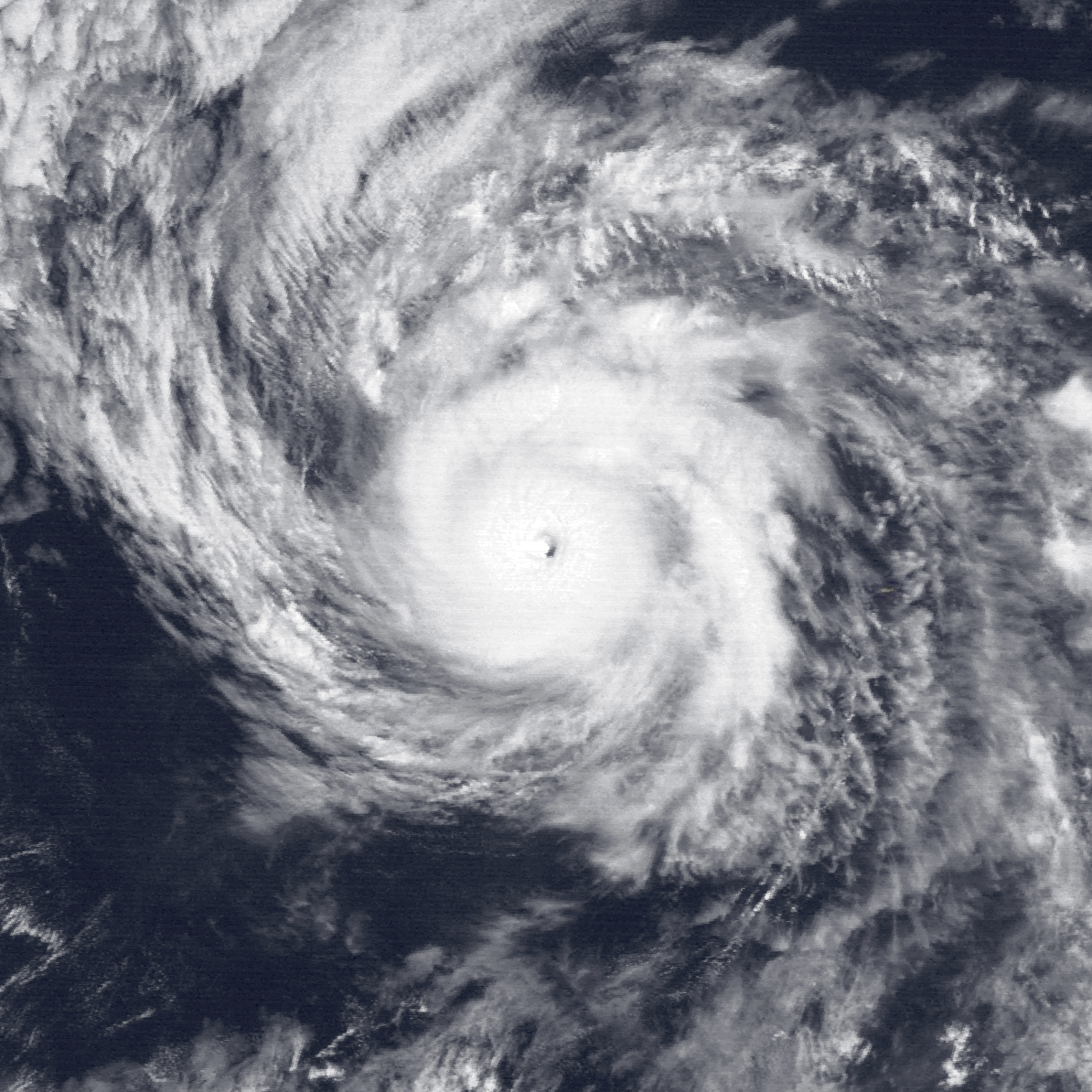
Hurricane Ismael at peak intensity late on August 19

- 12:00 UTC (5:00 a.m. PDT) at 18.4°N 115.6°W – Hurricane Ismael strengthens to Category 3 intensity while located about 480 mi (770 km) southwest of the southern tip of the Baja California peninsula, making it the first major hurricane of the season.
- 18:00 UTC (11:00 a.m. PDT) at 18.7°N 116.8°W – Hurricane Ismael attains its peak intensity, with maximum sustained winds of 120 mph (195 km/h) and a minimum central pressure of 955 mbar (28.20 inHg), while located about 530 mi (850 km) southwest of the southern tip of the Baja California peninsula.

August 20

- 06:00 UTC (11:00 p.m. PDT, August 19) at 19.0°N 119.2°W – Hurricane Ismael weakens to Category 2 intensity while located about 650 mi (1,045 km) west-southwest of the southern tip of the Baja California peninsula.
- 12:00 UTC (5:00 a.m. PDT) at 19.0°N 120.3°W – Hurricane Ismael again weakens to Category 1 intensity while located about 720 mi (1,160 km) west-southwest of the southern tip of the Baja California peninsula.

August 21

- 12:00 UTC (5:00 a.m. PDT) at 18.6°N 124.3°W – Hurricane Ismael again restrengthens to Category 2 intensity while located about 975 mi (1,565 km) west-southwest of the southern tip of the Baja California peninsula.
- 12:00 UTC (5:00 a.m. PDT) at 15.7°N 115.8°W – Tropical Depression Thirteen-E develops from a tropical wave while located about 625 mi (1,010 km) southwest of the southern tip of the Baja California peninsula.

August 22

- 06:00 UTC (11:00 p.m. PDT, August 21) at 17.3°N 117.8°W – Tropical Depression Thirteen-E strengthens into Tropical Storm Juliette while located about 640 mi (1,030 km) southwest of the southern tip of the Baja California peninsula.

August 23

- 00:00 UTC (5:00 p.m. PDT, August 22) at 18.4°N 130.0°W – Hurricane Ismael weakens to Category 1 intensity for the third and final time while located about 1,330 mi (2,140 km) west-southwest of the southern tip of the Baja California peninsula.
- 06:00 UTC (11:00 p.m. PDT, August 22) at 19.4°N 120.3°W – Tropical Storm Juliette attains its peak intensity, with maximum sustained winds of 65 mph (100 km/h) and a minimum central pressure 992 mbar (29.29 inHg), while located about 710 mi (1,140 km) west-southwest of the southern tip of the Baja California peninsula.
- 18:00 UTC (11:00 a.m. PDT) at 18.6°N 133.4°W – Hurricane Ismael weakens into a tropical storm while located about 1,540 mi (2,485 km) west of the southern tip of the Baja California peninsula.

August 24

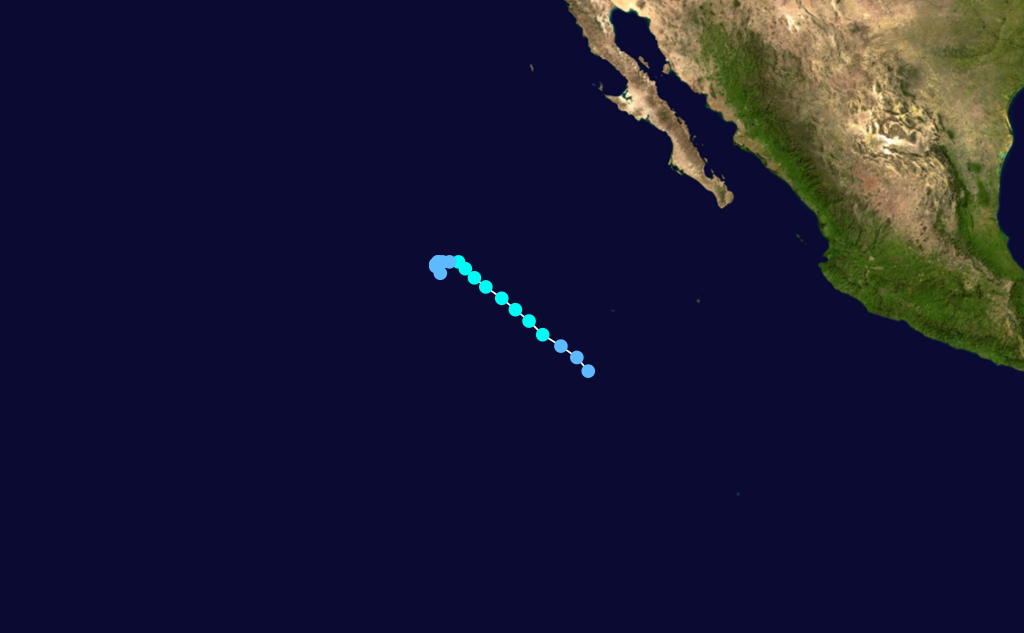
Storm track of Tropical Storm Juliette

- 06:00 UTC (11:00 p.m. PDT, August 23) at 20.5°N 121.9°W – Tropical Storm Juliette weakens into a tropical depression while located about 785 mi (1,260 km) west of the southern tip of the Baja California peninsula.
- 12:00 UTC (5:00 a.m. PDT) at 18.7°N 136.5°W – Tropical Storm Ismael weakens into a tropical depression while located about 1,740 mi (2,800 km) west of the southern tip of the Baja California peninsula.

August 25

- 12:00 UTC (2:00 a.m. HST) at 19.5°N 140.8°W (Note: HURDAT places Ismael at 19.5°N 140.5°W, or about 990 mi (1,595 km) east of South Point.) – Tropical Depression Ismael crosses 140°W into the Central Pacific basin while located about 975 mi (1,565 km) east of South Point.
- 12:00 UTC (5:00 a.m. PDT) at 21.7°N 107.0°W – Tropical Depression Fourteen-E develops from a mesoscale convective system while located about 110 mi (175 km) south-southwest of Mazatlán, Sinaloa.
- 18:00 UTC (8:00 a.m. HST) at 19.7°N 142.0°W (Note: HURDAT does not contain a data point for Ismael at 18:00 UTC (8:00 a.m. HST) on August 25, instead terminating the system six hours prior.) – Tropical Depression Ismael is last noted as a tropical cyclone while located about 890 mi (1,435 km) east of South Point, dissipating shortly thereafter.
- 18:00 UTC (11:00 a.m. PDT) at 20.0°N 122.3°W – Tropical Storm Juliette is last noted as a tropical cyclone while located about 815 mi (1,315 km) west-southwest of the southern tip of the Baja California peninsula, dissipating shortly thereafter.
- 18:00 UTC (11:00 a.m. PDT) at 21.9°N 107.2°W – Tropical Depression Fourteen-E strengthens into Tropical Storm Kiko while located about 105 mi (165 km) south-southwest of Mazatlán.

August 26

- 06:00 UTC (11:00 p.m. PDT, August 25) at 22.7°N 108.0°W – Tropical Storm Kiko strengthens into a Category 1 hurricane while located about 110 mi (175 km) west-southwest of Mazatlán.
- 12:00 UTC (5:00 a.m. PDT) at 23.0°N 108.4°W – Hurricane Kiko strengthens to Category 2 intensity while located about 100 mi (155 km) east of the southern tip of the Baja California peninsula.
- 18:00 UTC (11:00 a.m. PDT) at 23.2°N 108.8°W – Hurricane Kiko strengthens to Category 3 intensity while located about 75 mi (120 km) east-northeast of the southern tip of the Baja California peninsula, making it the second major hurricane of the season.

August 27

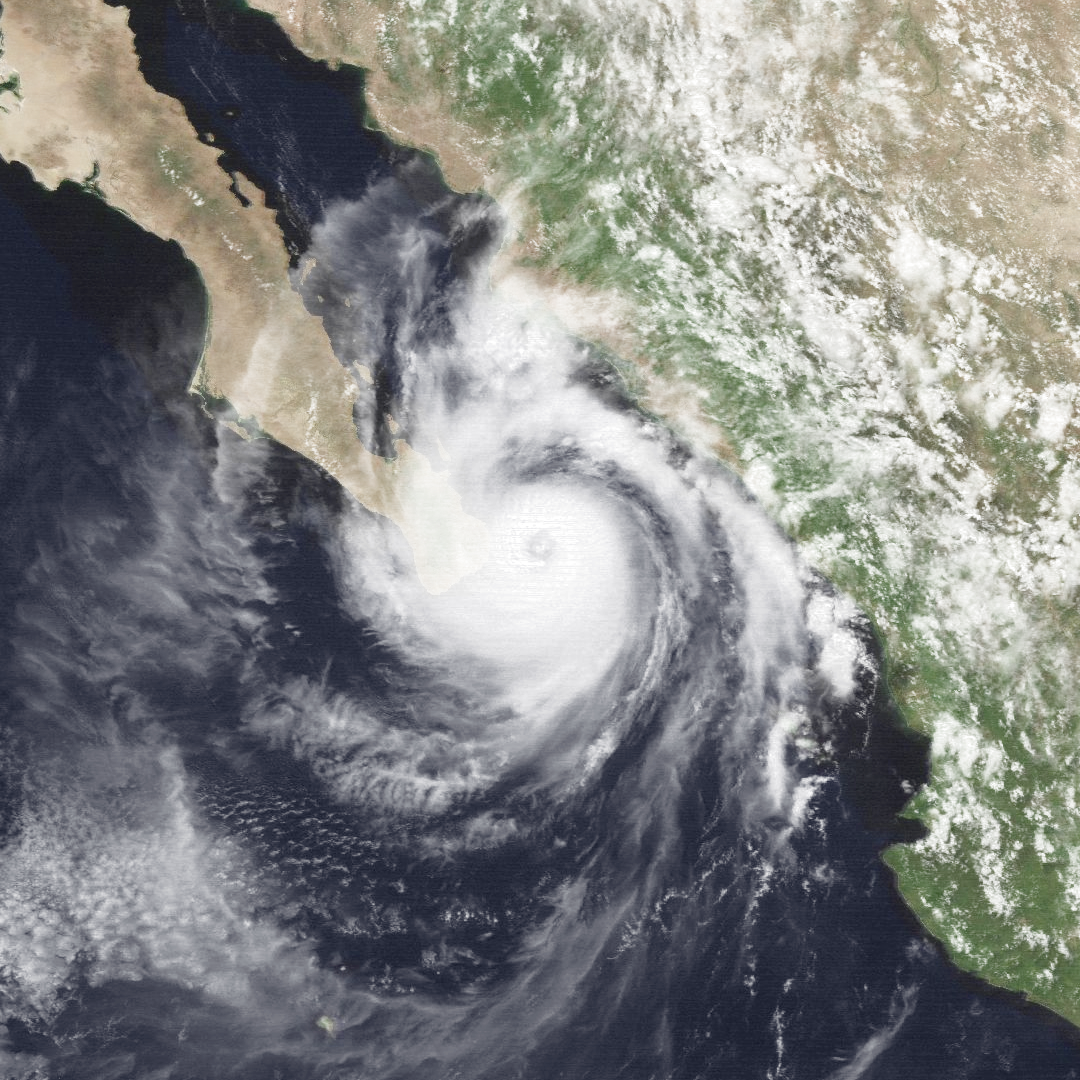
Hurricane Kiko rapidly strengthening toward peak intensity late on August 26

- 00:00 UTC (5:00 p.m. PDT, August 26) at 23.5°N 109.3°W – Hurricane Kiko attains its peak intensity, with maximum sustained winds of 120 mph (195 km/h) and a minimum central pressure of 955 mbar (28.20 inHg), while located about 60 mi (95 km) northeast of the southern tip of the Baja California peninsula.
- 06:00 UTC (11:00 p.m. PDT, August 26) at 23.6°N 109.7°W – Hurricane Kiko makes landfall near Punta Arena, Baja California Sur, or about 50 mi (85 km) north-northeast of the southern tip of the Baja California peninsula, with maximum sustained winds of 115 mph (185 km/h) and a central pressure of 960 mbar (28.35 inHg).
- 12:00 UTC (5:00 a.m. PDT) at 23.8°N 110.1°W – Hurricane Kiko rapidly weakens to Category 1 intensity while located over land about 65 mi (100 km) north of the southern tip of the Baja California peninsula.
- 18:00 UTC (11:00 a.m. PDT) at 23.8°N 110.5°W – Hurricane Kiko weakens into a tropical storm while located over land about 75 mi (120 km) north-northwest of the southern tip of the Baja California peninsula, and later emerges over the Pacific Ocean.
- 18:00 UTC (11:00 a.m. PDT) at 13.7°N 104.0°W – Tropical Depression Fifteen-E develops from a tropical wave while located about 370 mi (595 km) south of Manzanillo.

August 28

- 06:00 UTC (11:00 p.m. PDT, August 27) at 23.8°N 111.1°W – Tropical Storm Kiko weakens into a tropical depression while located about 100 mi (155 km) northwest of the southern tip of the Baja California peninsula.
- 18:00 UTC (11:00 a.m. PDT) at 15.9°N 105.3°W – Tropical Depression Fifteen-E strengthens into Tropical Storm Lorena while located about 225 mi (360 km) south-southwest of Manzanillo.
- 18:00 UTC (11:00 a.m. PDT) at 12.8°N 95.2°W – Tropical Depression Sixteen-E develops from an area of unsettled weather while located about 230 mi (370 km) south of Salina Cruz, Oaxaca.

August 29

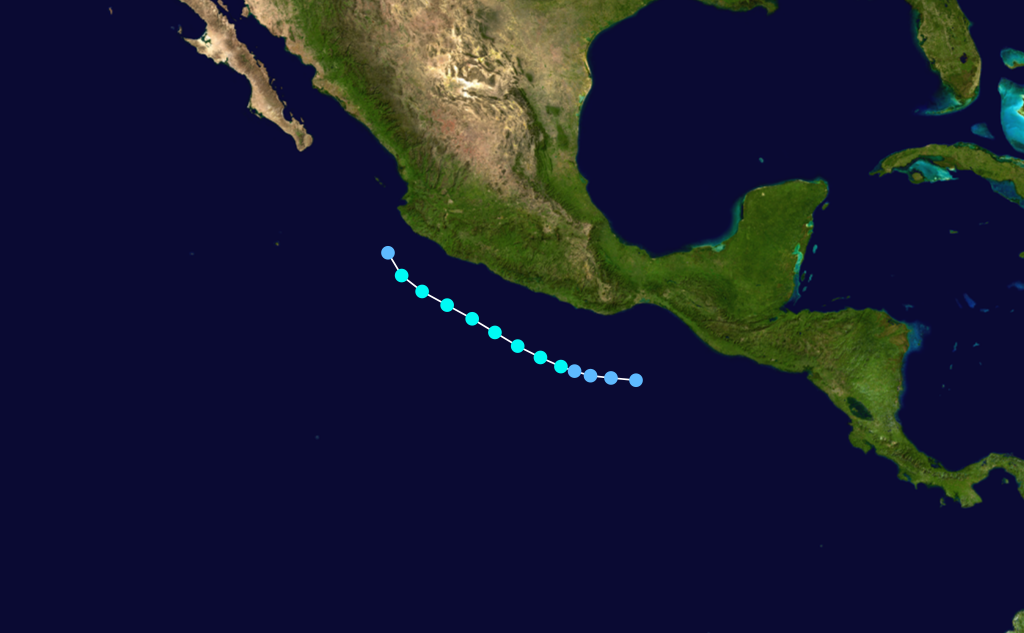
Storm track of Tropical Storm Manuel

- 18:00 UTC (11:00 a.m. PDT) at 21.0°N 113.1°W – Tropical Depression Kiko is last noted as a tropical cyclone while located about 240 mi (390 km) southwest of the southern tip of the Baja California peninsula, dissipating shortly thereafter when Tropical Storm Lorena absorbs it.
- 18:00 UTC (11:00 a.m. PDT) at 13.4°N 98.5°W – Tropical Depression Sixteen-E strengthens into Tropical Storm Manuel while located about 260 mi (415 km) south-southeast of Acapulco.

August 30

- 12:00 UTC (5:00 a.m. PDT) at 14.9°N 101.4°W – Tropical Storm Manuel attains its peak intensity, with maximum sustained winds of 45 mph (75 km/h) and a minimum central pressure of 1002 mbar (29.59 inHg), while located about 165 mi (270 km) southwest of Acapulco.

August 31

- 18:00 UTC (11:00 a.m. PDT) at 18.4°N 106.1°W – Tropical Storm Manuel weakens into a tropical depression while located about 125 mi (205 km) west-southwest of Manzanillo, dissipating shortly thereafter.

=== September ===
September 1

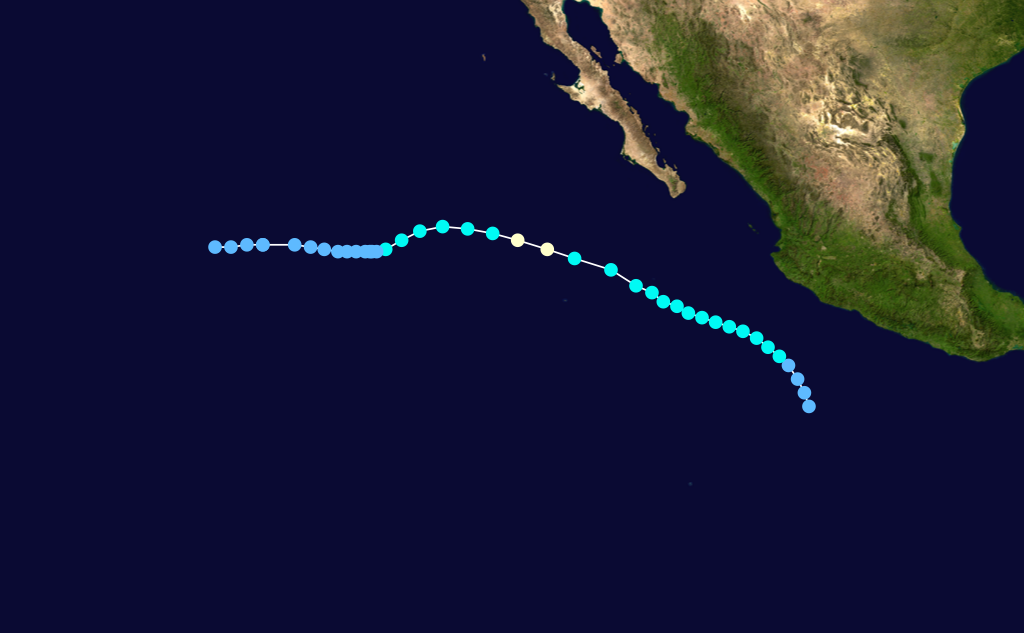
Storm track of Hurricane Lorena

- 06:00 UTC (11:00 p.m. PDT, August 31) at 20.6°N 115.5°W – Tropical Storm Lorena strengthens into a Category 1 hurricane while located about 390 mi (630 km) west-southwest of the southern tip of the Baja California peninsula. It simultaneously attains its peak intensity, with maximum sustained winds of 75 mph (120 km/h) and a minimum central pressure of 989 mbar (29.21 inHg).
- 18:00 UTC (11:00 a.m. PDT) at 21.3°N 117.9°W – Hurricane Lorena weakens into a tropical storm while located about 520 mi (835 km) west of the southern tip of the Baja California peninsula.

September 3

- 00:00 UTC (5:00 p.m. PDT, September 2) at 14.2°N 97.4°W – Tropical Depression Seventeen-E develops from a tropical wave while located about 245 mi (400 km) southeast of Acapulco.
- 06:00 UTC (11:00 p.m. PDT, September 2) at 20.5°N 123.0°W – Tropical Storm Lorena weakens into a tropical depression while located about 850 mi (1,370 km) west of the southern tip of the Baja California peninsula.

September 4

- 00:00 UTC (5:00 p.m. PDT, September 3) at 14.6°N 103.2°W – Tropical Depression Seventeen-E strengthens into Tropical Storm Narda while located about 270 mi (435 km) southwest of Acapulco.

September 5

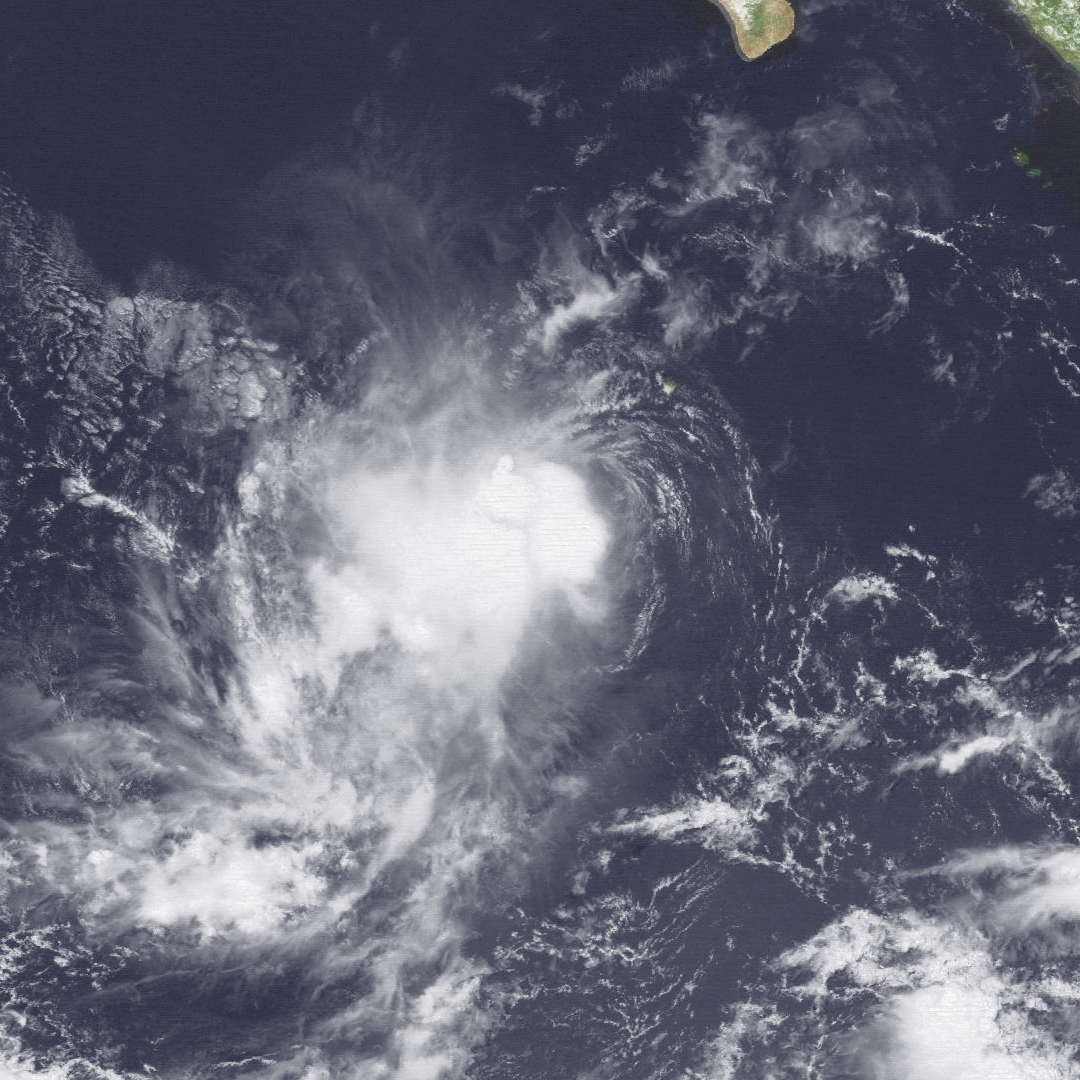
Tropical Storm Narda just after peak intensity late on September 5

- 00:00 UTC (5:00 p.m. PDT, September 4) at 15.9°N 108.2°W – Tropical Storm Narda attains its peak intensity, with maximum sustained winds of 50 mph (85 km/h) and a minimum central pressure of 1000 mbar (29.53 inHg), while located about 335 mi (535 km) southwest of Manzanillo.

September 6

- 18:00 UTC (11:00 a.m. PDT) at 20.7°N 130.1°W – Tropical Depression Lorena is last noted as a tropical cyclone while located about 1,300 mi (2,095 km) west of the southern tip of the Baja California peninsula, dissipating shortly thereafter.

September 7

- 00:00 UTC (5:00 p.m. PDT, September 6) at 19.1°N 116.7°W – Tropical Storm Narda weakens into a tropical depression while located about 505 mi (815 km) west-southwest of the southern tip of the Baja California peninsula.

September 8

- 00:00 UTC (5:00 p.m. PDT, September 7) at 20.1°N 120.2°W – Tropical Depression Narda is last noted as a tropical cyclone while located about 685 mi (1,105 km) west-southwest of the southern tip of the Baja California peninsula, dissipating shortly thereafter.
- 18:00 UTC (11:00 a.m. PDT) at 11.2°N 99.8°W – Tropical Depression Eighteen-E develops from a tropical wave while located about 390 mi (630 km) south of Acapulco.

September 10

- 06:00 UTC (11:00 p.m. PDT, September 9) at 14.4°N 105.6°W – Tropical Depression Eighteen-E strengthens into Tropical Storm Octave while located about 335 mi (535 km) south-southwest of Manzanillo.

September 11

- 18:00 UTC (11:00 a.m. PDT) at 17.0°N 111.3°W – Tropical Storm Octave strengthens into a Category 1 hurricane while located about 415 mi (665 km) south of the southern tip of the Baja California peninsula.

September 12

- 06:00 UTC (11:00 p.m. PDT, September 11) at 18.0°N 112.3°W – Hurricane Octave strengthens to Category 2 intensity while located about 370 mi (595 km) south-southwest of the southern tip of the Baja California peninsula.
- 12:00 UTC (5:00 a.m. PDT) at 18.9°N 112.8°W – Hurricane Octave strengthens to Category 3 intensity while located about 330 mi (530 km) southwest of the southern tip of the Baja California peninsula, making it the third major hurricane of the season.

September 13

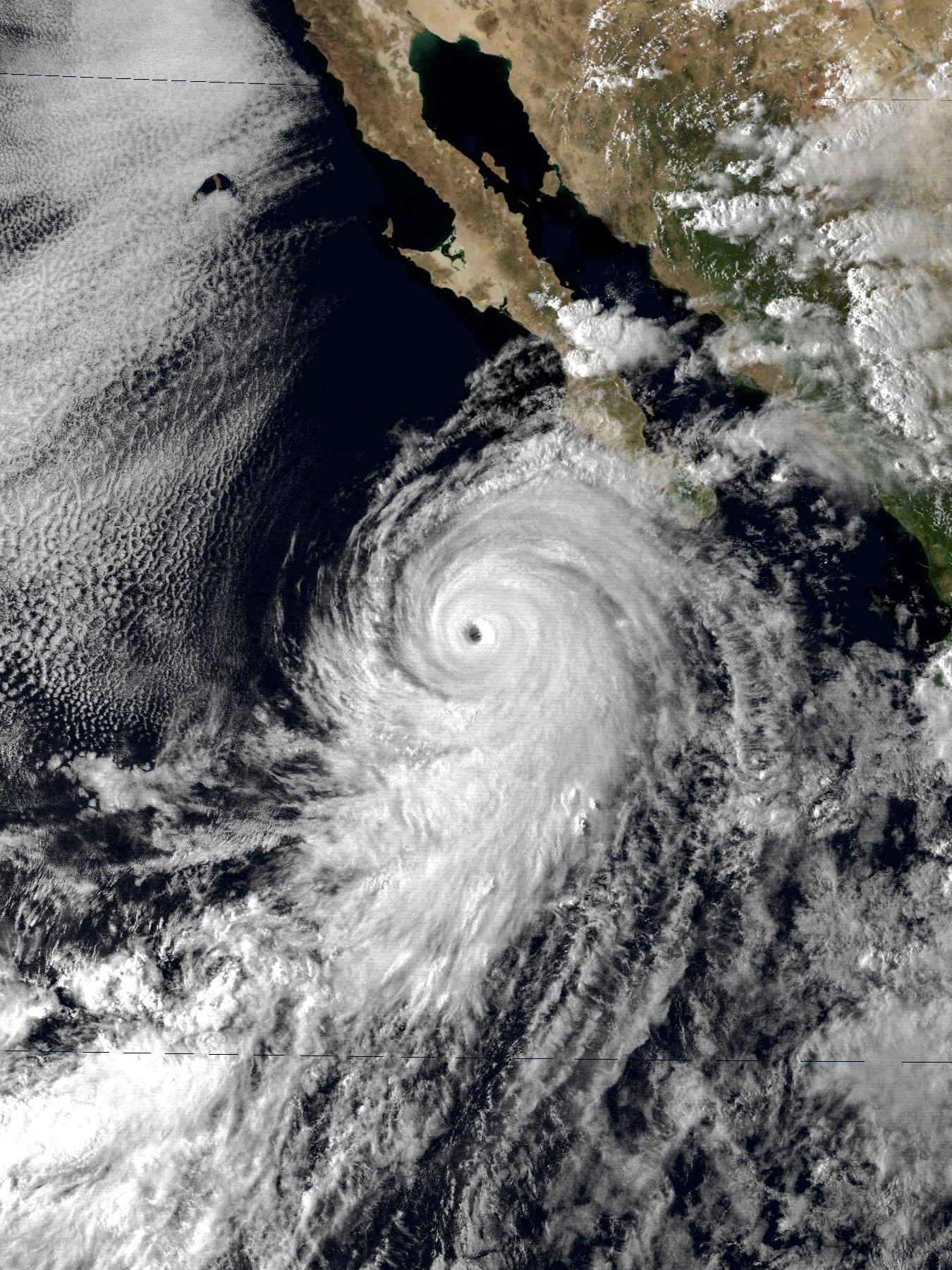
Hurricane Octave at peak intensity early on September 13

- 00:00 UTC (5:00 p.m. PDT, September 12) at 20.9°N 113.8°W – Hurricane Octave strengthens to Category 4 intensity while located about 280 mi (455 km) west-southwest of the southern tip of the Baja California peninsula. It simultaneously attains its peak intensity, with maximum sustained winds of 130 mph (215 km/h) and a minimum central pressure of 948 mbar (27.99 inHg).
- 06:00 UTC (11:00 p.m. PDT, September 12) at 21.8°N 114.6°W – Hurricane Octave weakens to Category 3 intensity while located about 305 mi (490 km) west-southwest of the southern tip of the Baja California peninsula.
- 18:00 UTC (11:00 a.m. PDT) at 23.0°N 116.4°W – Hurricane Octave weakens to Category 2 intensity while located about 410 mi (660 km) west of the southern tip of the Baja California peninsula.

September 14

- 00:00 UTC (5:00 p.m. PDT, September 13) at 23.5°N 117.1°W – Hurricane Octave weakens to Category 1 intensity while located about 330 mi (530 km) south-southwest of Punta Eugenia.
- 12:00 UTC (5:00 a.m. PDT) at 24.5°N 118.3°W – Hurricane Octave weakens into a tropical storm while located about 305 mi (490 km) southwest of Punta Eugenia.

September 15

- 18:00 UTC (11:00 a.m. PDT) at 27.2°N 119.5°W – Tropical Storm Octave weakens into a tropical depression while located about 275 mi (445 km) west-southwest of Punta Eugenia.

September 16

- 18:00 UTC (11:00 a.m. PDT) at 28.4°N 118.1°W – Tropical Depression Octave is last noted as a tropical cyclone while located about 190 mi (305 km) west of Punta Eugenia, dissipating shortly thereafter.

September 21

- 06:00 UTC (11:00 p.m. PDT, September 20) at 18.1°N 104.5°W – Tropical Depression Nineteen-E develops from a tropical wave while located about 70 mi (110 km) south of Manzanillo.
- 18:00 UTC (11:00 a.m. PDT) at 19.3°N 106.3°W – Tropical Depression Nineteen-E strengthens into Tropical Storm Priscilla while located about 85 mi (140 km) south-southwest of Cabo Corrientes, Jalisco.

September 23

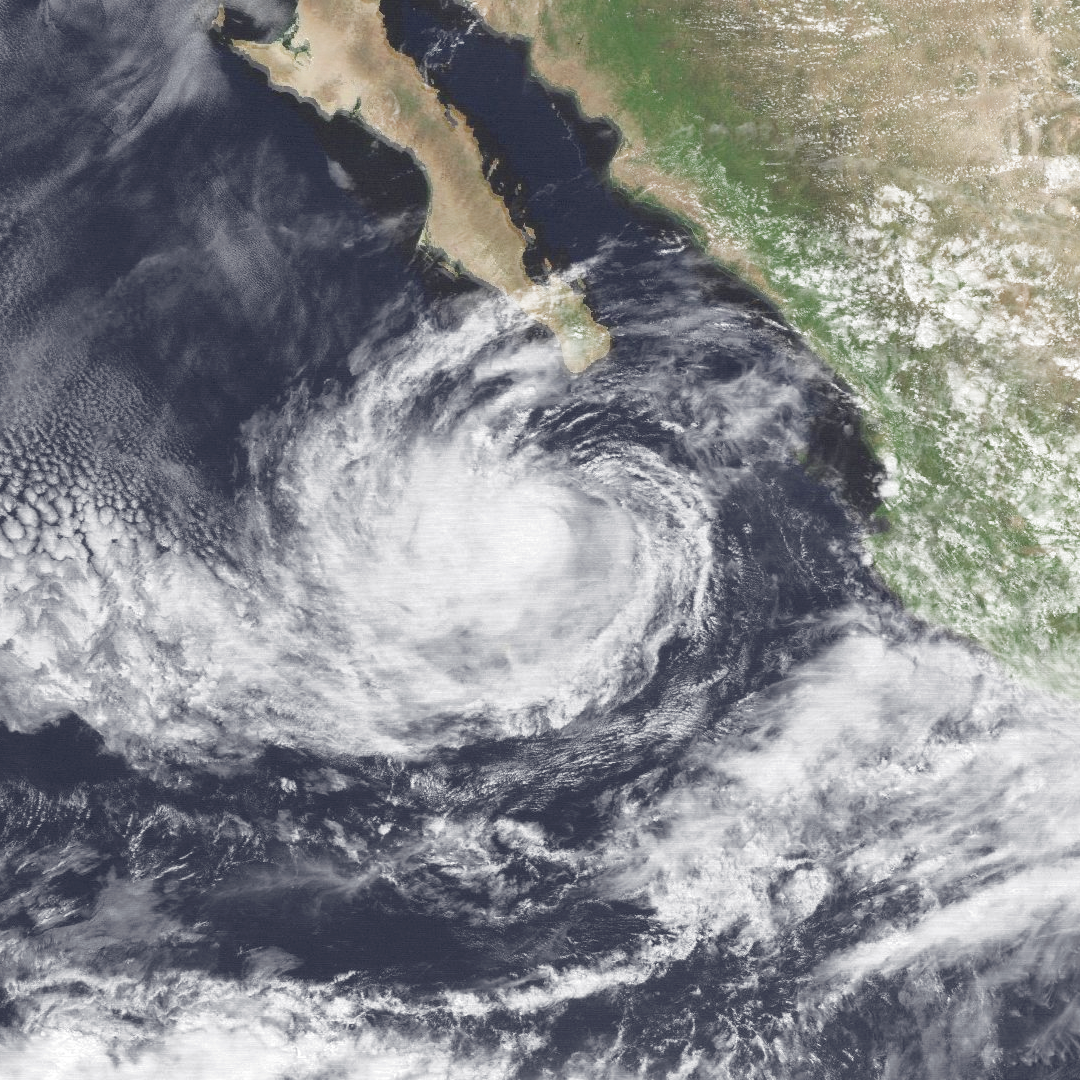
Tropical Storm Priscilla near peak intensity late on September 22

- 00:00 UTC (5:00 p.m. PDT, September 22) at 20.7°N 110.7°W – Tropical Storm Priscilla attains its peak intensity, with maximum sustained winds of 65 mph (100 km/h) and a minimum central pressure of 993 mbar (29.32 inHg), while located about 155 mi (250 km) south-southwest of the southern tip of the Baja California peninsula.

September 24

- 06:00 UTC (11:00 p.m. PDT, September 23) at 20.7°N 114.2°W – Tropical Storm Priscilla weakens into a tropical depression while located about 310 mi (500 km) west-southwest of the southern tip of the Baja California peninsula.

September 25

- 00:00 UTC (5:00 p.m. PDT, September 24) at 13.7°N 99.0°W – Tropical Depression Twenty One-E develops from a tropical wave while located about 225 mi (360 km) south-southeast of Acapulco. (Note: The NHC operationally did not initiate advisories on Tropical Depression Twenty One-E—future Hurricane Raymond—until 14:30 UTC (7:30 a.m. PDT) on September 26, hence why it received a higher number than Tropical Depression Twenty One-E despite forming 18 hours earlier.)
- 18:00 UTC (11:00 a.m. PDT) at 20.4°N 119.1°W – Tropical Depression Priscilla is last noted as a tropical cyclone while located about 610 mi (980 km) west-southwest of the southern tip of the Baja California peninsula, dissipating shortly thereafter.
- 18:00 UTC (11:00 a.m. PDT) at 14.4°N 93.3°W – Tropical Depression Twenty-E develops from an area of unsettled weather while located about 180 mi (285 km) southeast of Salina Cruz.

September 26

- 00:00 UTC (5:00 p.m. PDT, September 25) at 14.4°N 93.7°W – Tropical Depression Twenty-E attains its peak intensity, with maximum sustained winds of 35 mph (55 km/h) and an unknown central pressure, while located about 155 mi (250 km) southeast of Salina Cruz.
- 18:00 UTC (11:00 a.m. PDT) at 15.2°N 102.0°W – Tropical Depression Twenty One-E strengthens into Tropical Storm Raymond while located about 185 mi (295 km) southwest of Acapulco.

September 27

- 12:00 UTC (5:00 a.m. PDT) at 13.6°N 94.9°W – Tropical Depression Twenty-E is last noted as a tropical cyclone while located about 180 mi (285 km) south of Salina Cruz, dissipating shortly thereafter.

September 28

- 18:00 UTC (11:00 a.m. PDT) at 15.9°N 106.0°W – Tropical Storm Raymond strengthens into a Category 1 hurricane while located about 310 mi (500 km) south of Cabo Corrientes.

September 29

- 12:00 UTC (5:00 a.m. PDT) at 15.7°N 108.2°W – Hurricane Raymond strengthens to Category 2 intensity while located about 365 mi (585 km) south-southwest of Cabo Corrientes.

September 30

- 00:00 UTC (5:00 p.m. PDT, September 29) at 16.0°N 109.6°W – Hurricane Raymond strengthens to Category 3 intensity while located about 395 mi (640 km) southwest of Cabo Corrientes, making it the fourth and final major hurricane of the season.
- 18:00 UTC (11:00 a.m. PDT) at 16.7°N 112.5°W – Hurricane Raymond strengthens to Category 4 intensity while located about 455 mi (730 km) south-southwest of the southern tip of the Baja California peninsula.

=== October ===
October 1

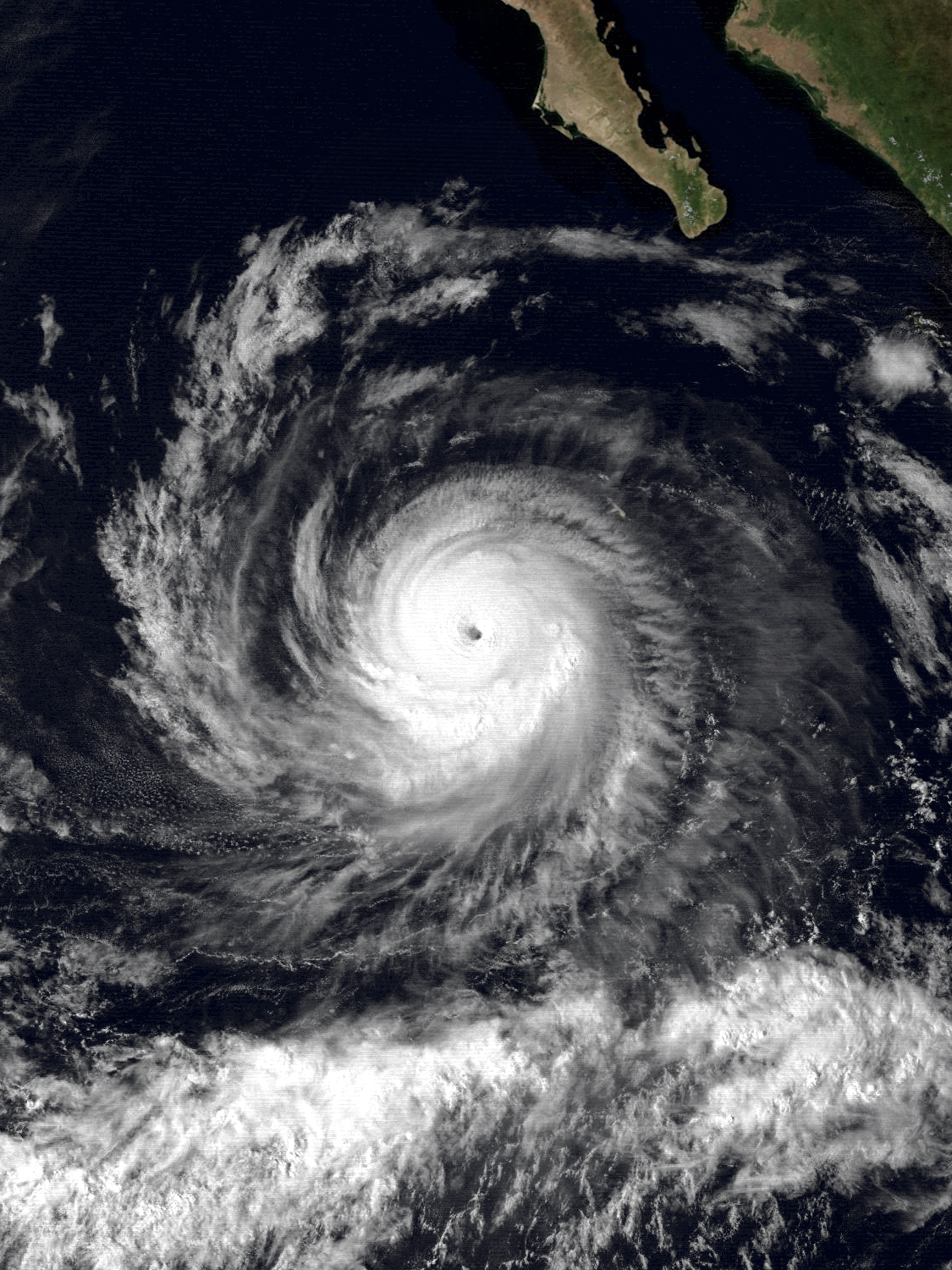
Hurricane Raymond shortly before peak intensity late on September 30

- 00:00 UTC (5:00 p.m. PDT, September 30) at 17.0°N 113.4°W – Hurricane Raymond attains its peak intensity, with maximum sustained winds of 145 mph (230 km/h) and a minimum central pressure of 935 mbar (27.61 inHg), while located about 460 mi (740 km) south-southwest of the southern tip of the Baja California peninsula, making it the strongest storm of the season.

October 2

- 00:00 UTC (5:00 p.m. PDT, October 1) at 18.4°N 116.7°W – Hurricane Raymond weakens to Category 3 intensity while located about 535 mi (860 km) southwest of the southern tip of the Baja California peninsula.

October 3

- 00:00 UTC (5:00 p.m. PDT, October 2) at 19.4°N 118.1°W – Hurricane Raymond weakens to Category 2 intensity while located about 575 mi (925 km) west-southwest of the southern tip of the Baja California peninsula.
- 12:00 UTC (5:00 a.m. PDT) at 20.2°N 117.7°W – Hurricane Raymond weakens to Category 1 intensity while located about 530 mi (850 km) west-southwest of the southern tip of the Baja California peninsula.
- 12:00 UTC (5:00 a.m. PDT) at 13.0°N 103.0°W – Tropical Depression Twenty Two-E develops from an area of unsettled weather while located about 540 mi (870 km) south-southeast of Cabo Corrientes.
- 18:00 UTC (11:00 a.m. PDT) at 13.5°N 104.8°W – Tropical Depression Twenty Two-E attains its peak intensity, with maximum sustained winds of 35 mph (55 km/h) and an unknown central pressure, while located about 485 mi (780 km) south of Cabo Corrientes.

October 4

- 12:00 UTC (5:00 a.m. PDT) at 23.8°N 115.5°W – Hurricane Raymond weakens into a tropical storm while located about 235 mi (380 km) south-southwest of Punta Abreojos, Baja California Sur.
- 23:00 UTC (4:00 p.m. PDT) at 26.8°N 113.5°W – Tropical Storm Raymond makes its first landfall near Punta Abreojos with maximum sustained winds of 50 mph (85 km/h) and a central pressure of 995 mbar (29.38 inHg), and later emerges over the Gulf of California.

October 5

- 05:00 UTC (10:00 p.m. PDT, October 4) at 29.0°N 112.2°W – Tropical Storm Raymond makes its second and final landfall about 70 mi (110 km) south-southeast of Puerto Libertad, Sonora, with maximum sustained winds of 40 mph (65 km/h) and a central pressure of 1000 mbar (29.53 inHg).
- 12:00 UTC (5:00 a.m. PDT) at 31.8°N 110.2°W – Tropical Storm Raymond weakens into a tropical depression while located over land about 40 mi (65 km) southwest of Willcox, Arizona.
- 18:00 UTC (11:00 a.m. PDT) at 33.4°N 108.0°W – Tropical Depression Raymond transitions into an extratropical cyclone while located over land about 130 mi (215 km) northeast of Willcox, dissipating shortly thereafter. (Note: HURDAT maintains Raymond as a tropical depression at 18:00 UTC (11:00 a.m. PDT) on October 5.)

October 8

- 06:00 UTC (11:00 p.m. PDT, October 7) at 14.2°N 115.3°W – Tropical Depression Twenty Two-E is last noted as a tropical cyclone while located about 765 mi (1,230 km) southwest of Cabo Corrientes, dissipating shortly thereafter.

October 14

- 06:00 UTC (11:00 p.m. PDT, October 13) at 11.3°N 101.3°W – Tropical Depression Twenty Three-E develops from an area of unsettled weather while located about 395 mi (640 km) south-southwest of Acapulco. It is already at its peak intensity, with maximum sustained winds of 25 mph (35 km/h) and an unknown central pressure, and dissipates shortly after formation.

October 16

- 00:00 UTC (5:00 p.m. PDT, October 15) at 15.8°N 116.8°W – Tropical Depression Twenty Four-E develops from an area of unsettled weather while located about 660 mi (1,065 km) southwest of the southern tip of the Baja California peninsula.

October 18

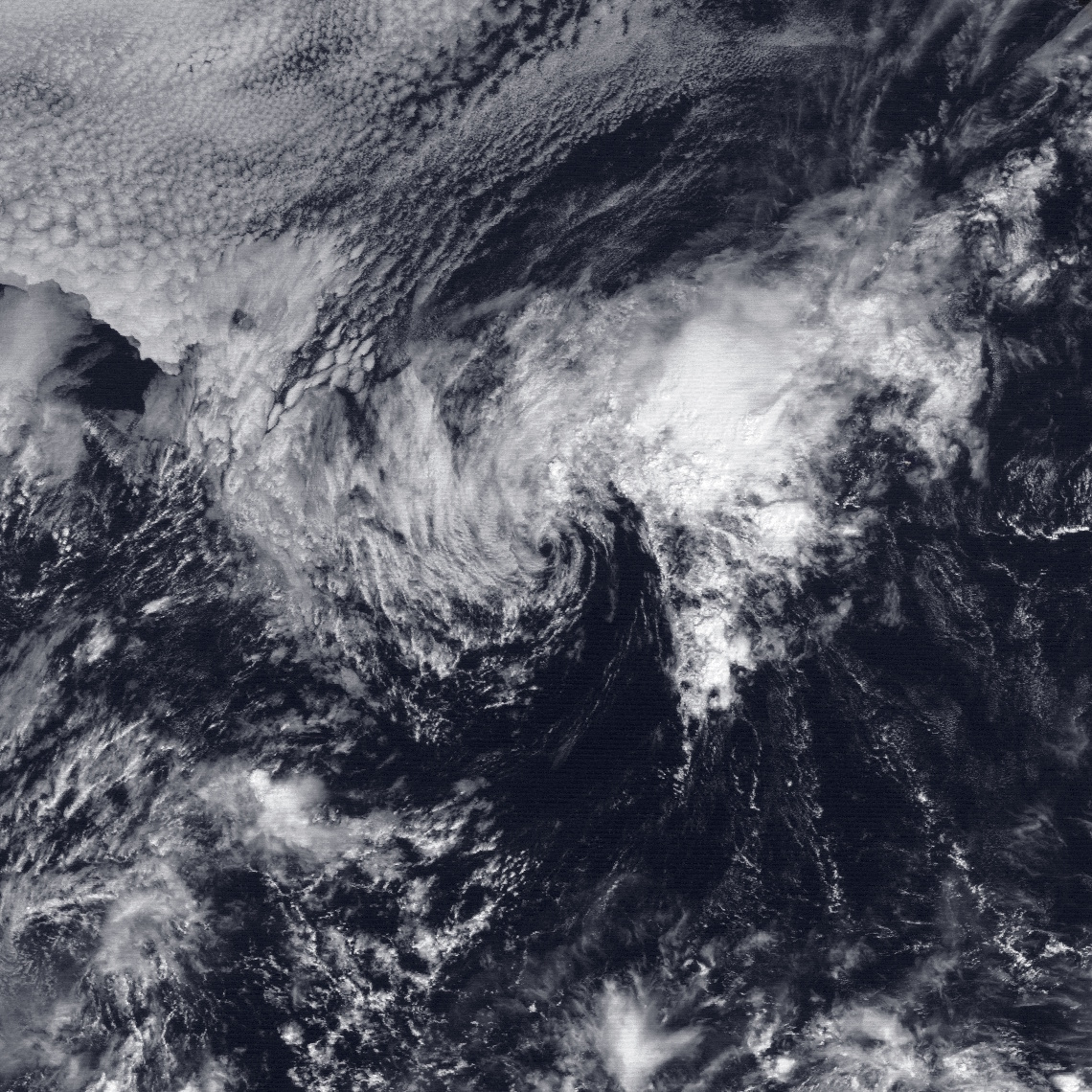
Tropical Depression Twenty Four-E near peak intensity late on October 18

- 00:00 UTC (5:00 p.m. PDT, October 17) at 16.3°N 118.4°W – Tropical Depression Twenty Four-E attains its peak intensity, with maximum sustained winds of 35 mph (55 km/h) and an unknown central pressure, while located about 715 mi (1,150 km) southwest of the southern tip of the Baja California peninsula.

October 19

- 12:00 UTC (5:00 a.m. PDT) at 17.4°N 121.6°W – Tropical Depression Twenty Four-E is last noted as a tropical cyclone while located about 845 mi (1,360 km) west-southwest of the southern tip of the Baja California peninsula, dissipating shortly thereafter.

=== November ===
There were no tropical cyclones in November.

November 30

- The 1989 Pacific hurricane season officially ends.

== See also ==
- List of Pacific hurricane records
- Timeline of the 1989 Atlantic hurricane season
- Tropical cyclones in 1989
