= List of storms named Dalila =

The name Dalila, or earlier Dalilia, has been used for eight tropical cyclones in the Eastern Pacific Ocean.

- Tropical Storm Dalilia (1983), never affected land
- Hurricane Dalilia (1989), passed just south of the Hawaiian Islands
- Tropical Storm Dalila (1995), did not make landfall
- Hurricane Dalila (2001), passed directly over Socorro Island as a tropical storm
- Tropical Storm Dalila (2007), passed over Socorro Island
- Hurricane Dalila (2013), made some impact on the western shore of Mexico and then shifted westward out to sea
- Tropical Storm Dalila (2019), never threatened land
- Tropical Storm Dalila (2025), affected southwestern Mexico
