= Hurricane Dalilia =

Category 1 hurricane in 1989

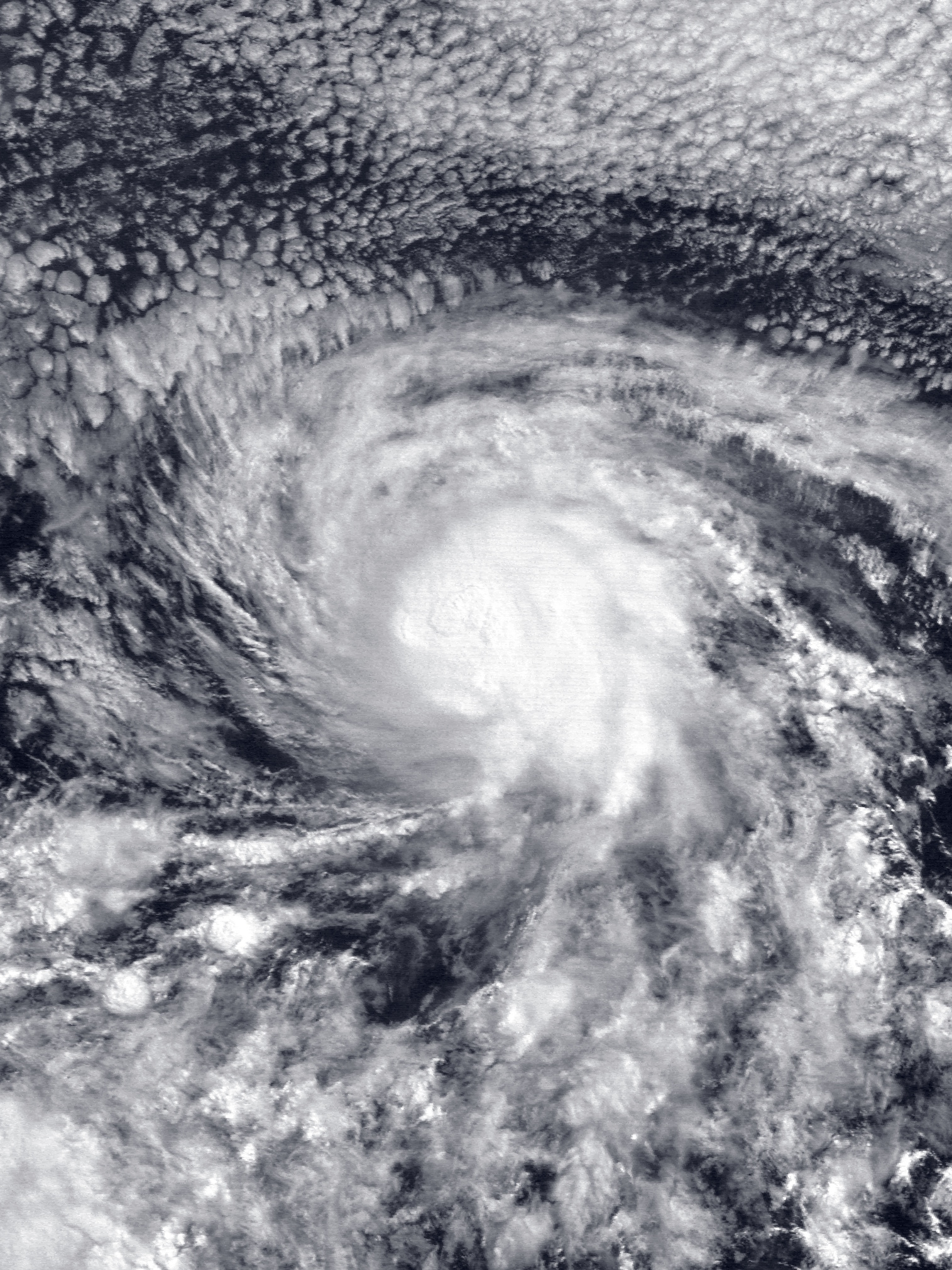
- Hurricane Dalilia at peak intensity on July 16

Meteorological history
- Formed: July 11, 1989
- Dissipated: July 21, 1989

Category 1 hurricane
- 1-minute sustained (SSHWS/NWS)
- Highest winds: 90 mph (150 km/h)
- Lowest pressure: 977 mbar (hPa); 28.85 inHg

Overall effects
- Fatalities: None reported
- Damage: Minimal
- Areas affected: Hawaii
- IBTrACS
- Part of the 1989 Pacific hurricane season

Hurricane Dalilia was the only tropical cyclone during 1989 to affect the Hawaiian Islands. A tropical disturbance developed into a tropical depression on July 11 and into Hurricane Dalilia on July 13. Dalilia crossed 140°W shortly after reaching its maximum intensity and entered the Central Pacific Hurricane Center's area of responsibility. The storm accelerated, and headed directly towards the Hawaiian Islands. Hurricane Dalilia passed just south of the Hawaiian Islands as a tropical storm before dissipating July 21 as it interacted with a trough. It then interacted with the remains of Tropical Storm Erick and reformed into a depression on July 24. A trough then accelerated the remnants towards the Aleutian Islands on July 28. The cyclone's effects were minimal. There was high surf, and some gusty winds. Damage was minor, and mainly limited to downed power lines. However, many areas throughout the island chain received more than 5 in (130 mm) of precipitation.

== Meteorological history ==
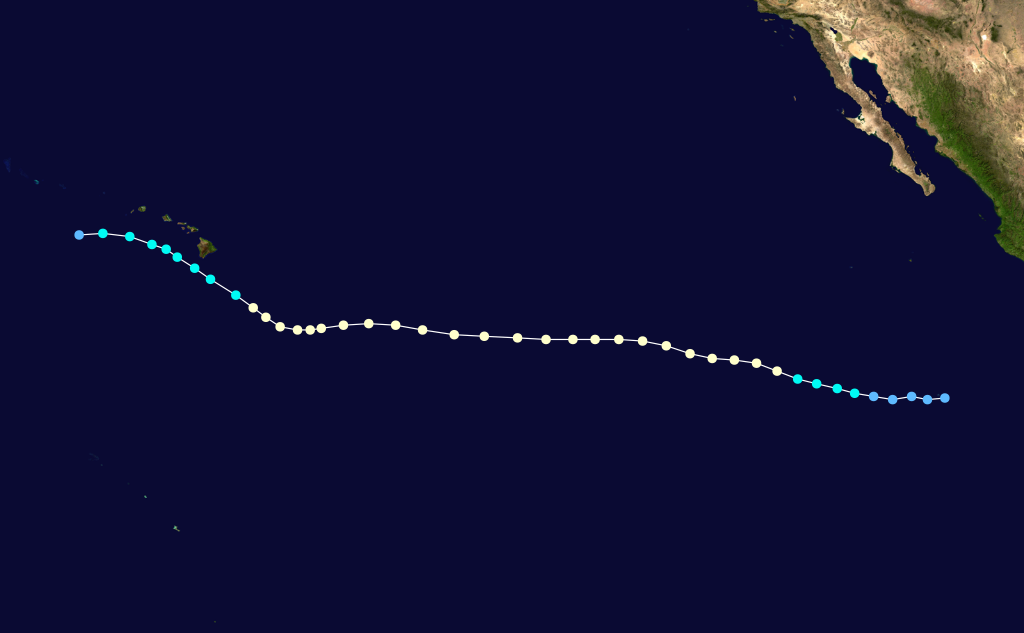
Map plotting the storm's track and intensity, according to the Saffir–Simpson scale Map key Saffir–Simpson scale Tropical depression (≤38 mph, ≤62 km/h) Tropical storm (39–73 mph, 63–118 km/h) Category 1 (74–95 mph, 119–153 km/h) Category 2 (96–110 mph, 154–177 km/h) Category 3 (111–129 mph, 178–208 km/h) Category 4 (130–156 mph, 209–251 km/h) Category 5 (≥157 mph, ≥252 km/h) Unknown Storm type Tropical cyclone Subtropical cyclone Extratropical cyclone, remnant low, tropical disturbance, or monsoon depression

Hurricane Dalilia originated out of a tropical disturbance embedded in the Intertropical Convergence Zone (ITCZ) during early July 1989 off the west coast of Africa. As the system became increasingly organized, the disturbance's outflow suppressed the ITCZ. By July 9, the disturbance had entered the eastern Pacific Ocean and sufficient convective development to prompt Dvorak Technique intensity estimates. Continued development took place in the following days; on July 11, the National Hurricane Center determined that the disturbance spawned a tropical depression 792 mi (1,275 km) southwest of Cabo San Lucas. Upon being designated a depression, it was still partially embedded within the ITCZ, inhibiting rapid development. In fact, the National Hurricane Center did not operationally begin advisories on the depression until almost 24 hours later. After the National Hurricane Center began issuing advisories, the depression quickly became more well-defined, as it began separating from the ITCZ on July 12. In addition, significant further intensification was expected, as sea surface temperatures (SST's) were greater than 78.8 °F (26 °C). Only a few hours later, satellite imagery showed a significant increase in convection. Tracking in a general west-northwest direction, the depression intensified into a tropical storm late on July 12, at which time it was given the name Dalilia by the NHC.

Dalilia rapidly intensified after becoming a tropical storm, and several computer models predicted it to reach winds of 100 mph (155 km/h) by July 15. Six hours later, the National Hurricane Center upgraded Dalilia to a hurricane, after winds were estimated at 75 mph (120 km/h), and satellite imagery suggested that the hurricane was continuing to organize. However, post-storm analysis show this upgrade as several hours premature. While Dalilia developed well-defined spiral convective bands, it had remained a minimal hurricane, since no eye had formed. Despite earlier forecasts for low wind shear values, upper-level winds appeared less favorable for further intensification, after water vapor imagery showed several upper-level low pressure areas to the north and northeast of Dalilia. Although the National Hurricane Center operationally held the intensity of Dalilia at minimal hurricane status for a while; post-analysis data show that Dalilia was slowly intensifying. By July 16, the storm developed a central dense overcast, leading to further intensification. Although the storm tracked near cool waters, a well-developed outflow allowed it to maintain hurricane-intensity.

Shortly before crossing into the Central Pacific Hurricane Center's area of responsibility, the storm reached its peak intensity with winds of 90 mph (150 km/h) and a central pressure of 977 mbar (hPa; 28.85 inHg). After crossing 140°W, Dalilia weakened to a minimal hurricane. The storm maintained this intensity until July 19, at which time the system slowed and turned northwest. The following day, the weakening tropical storm brushed the Hawaiian Islands to the south, eventually curving away from the island chain on July 21. Later that day, Dalilia further weakened to a tropical depression, with the Central Pacific Hurricane Center issuing their final advisory at that time. The remnants of the former hurricane continued to track northwest. On July 24, the system interacted with the remnants of Tropical Storm Erick and may have briefly re-attained tropical storm intensity; however, by July 28, the storm was rapidly tracking north through the Aleutian Islands. The remnants of Dalilia dissipated shortly thereafter.

== Preparations and impact ==
In preparation of the storm, a high surf advisory and a tropical storm watch were issued for the Hawaiian Islands. Officials urged residents to stock up on supplies and they closed beaches. Even though the Central Pacific Hurricane Center remarked that that watch will likely be upgraded into a hurricane warning, this failed to occur; instead, the watch was discontinued on July 20 because meteorologists were now expecting the storm to pass south of the island chain.

While tracking near the Hawaiian Islands, Dalilia produced waves up to 20 ft (6.1 m) along south-facing coastlines. Along the coasts of Ka'u and South Kona, winds gusted up to 45 mph (75 km/h); the winds caused minor damage, mainly downed power lines. Most areas on Oahu received up to 3 in (76 mm) of rain with localized areas reporting up to 8 in (200 mm). Hurricane Dalilia contributed to a record rainfall total for the month of July in Honolulu with 2.33 in (59 mm) falling during the storm's passage. The heaviest rainfall was recorded on the north side of Kauai, with localized areas receiving rainfall in excess of 10 in (250 mm). Along the southeast slopes of Mauna Loa, upwards of 9 in (230 mm) of rain fell. The remnants of the storm continued to produce unseasonable rains in the Northwestern Hawaiian Islands through July 28. Heavy rains caused minor flooding which forced transit officials to shut down several roads. Many power lines were down, which produced minor wind damage.

== See also ==
- Other tropical cyclones named Dalilia or Dalila
- List of Hawaii hurricanes
