= 1952 Pacific typhoon season =

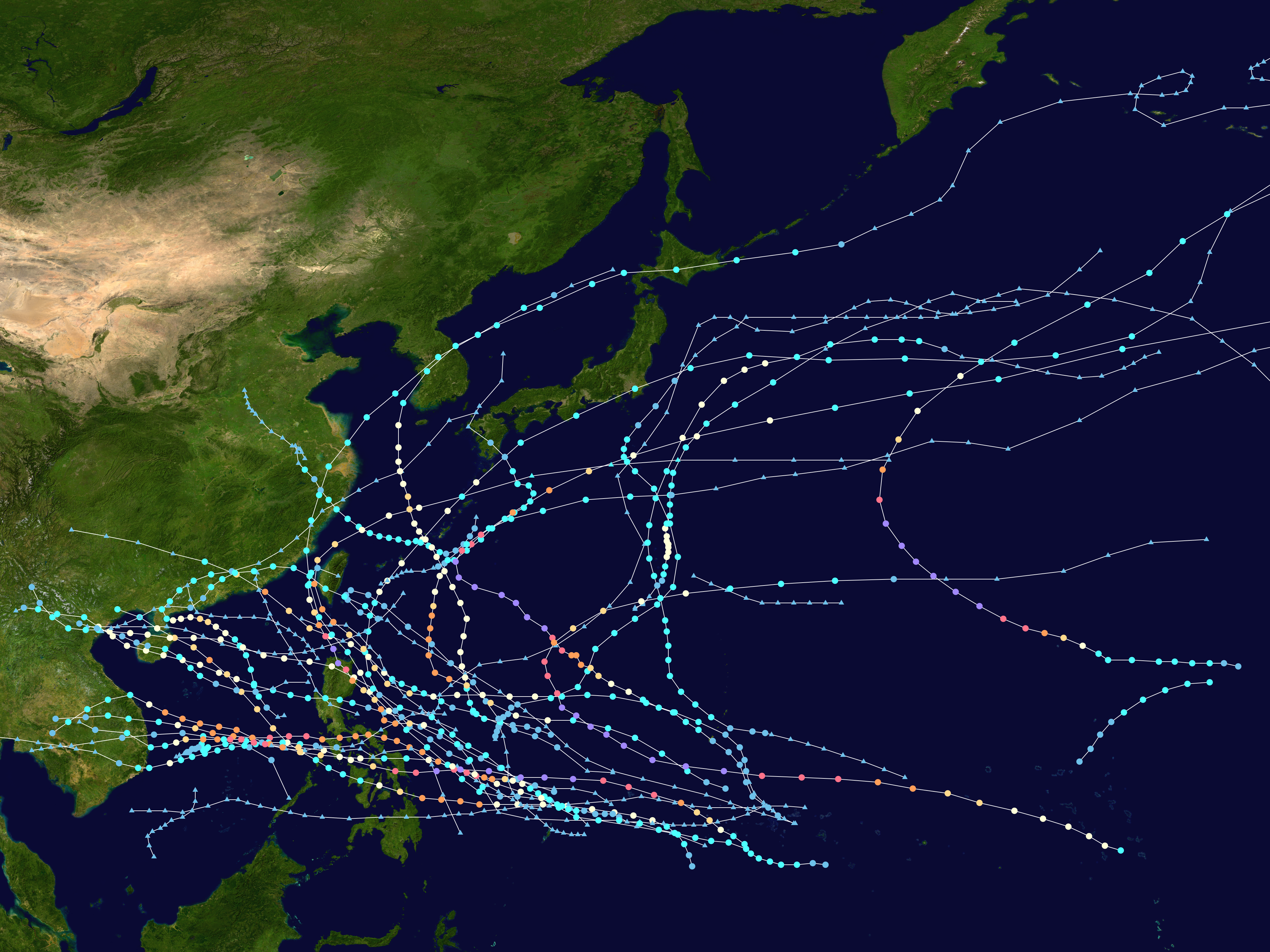
- Season summary map

Seasonal boundaries
- First system formed: May 5, 1952
- Last system dissipated: January 4, 1953 (record latest)

Strongest storm
- Name: Wilma
  - Maximum winds: 295 km/h (185 mph) (1-minute sustained)
  - Lowest pressure: 893 hPa (mbar)

Seasonal statistics
- Total storms: 29
- Typhoons: 20
- Very strong typhoons: 6 (unofficial)
- Total fatalities: 1,070
- Total damage: Unknown

Related articles
- 1952 Atlantic hurricane season; 1952 Pacific hurricane season; 1950s North Indian Ocean cyclone seasons

The 1952 Pacific typhoon season had no official bounds, but most tropical cyclones tend to form in the northwestern Pacific Ocean between June and December. These dates conventionally delimit the period of each year when most tropical cyclones form in the northwestern Pacific Ocean.

The scope of this article is limited to the Pacific Ocean, north of the equator and west of the International Date Line. Storms that form east of the date line and north of the equator are called hurricanes; see 1952 Pacific hurricane season. Tropical Storms formed in the entire west Pacific basin were assigned a name by the Fleet Weather Center on Guam.

== Systems ==
=== Typhoon Charlotte ===
- Typhoon (JMA)
- Category 2 typhoon (SSHWS)
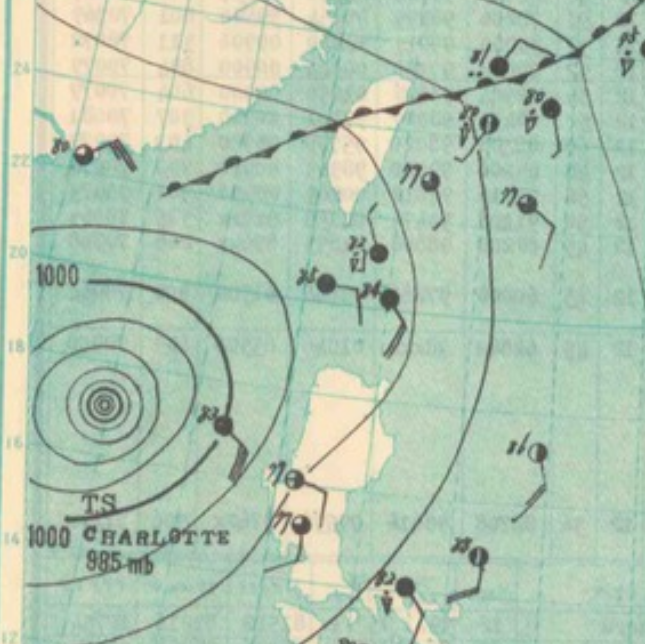
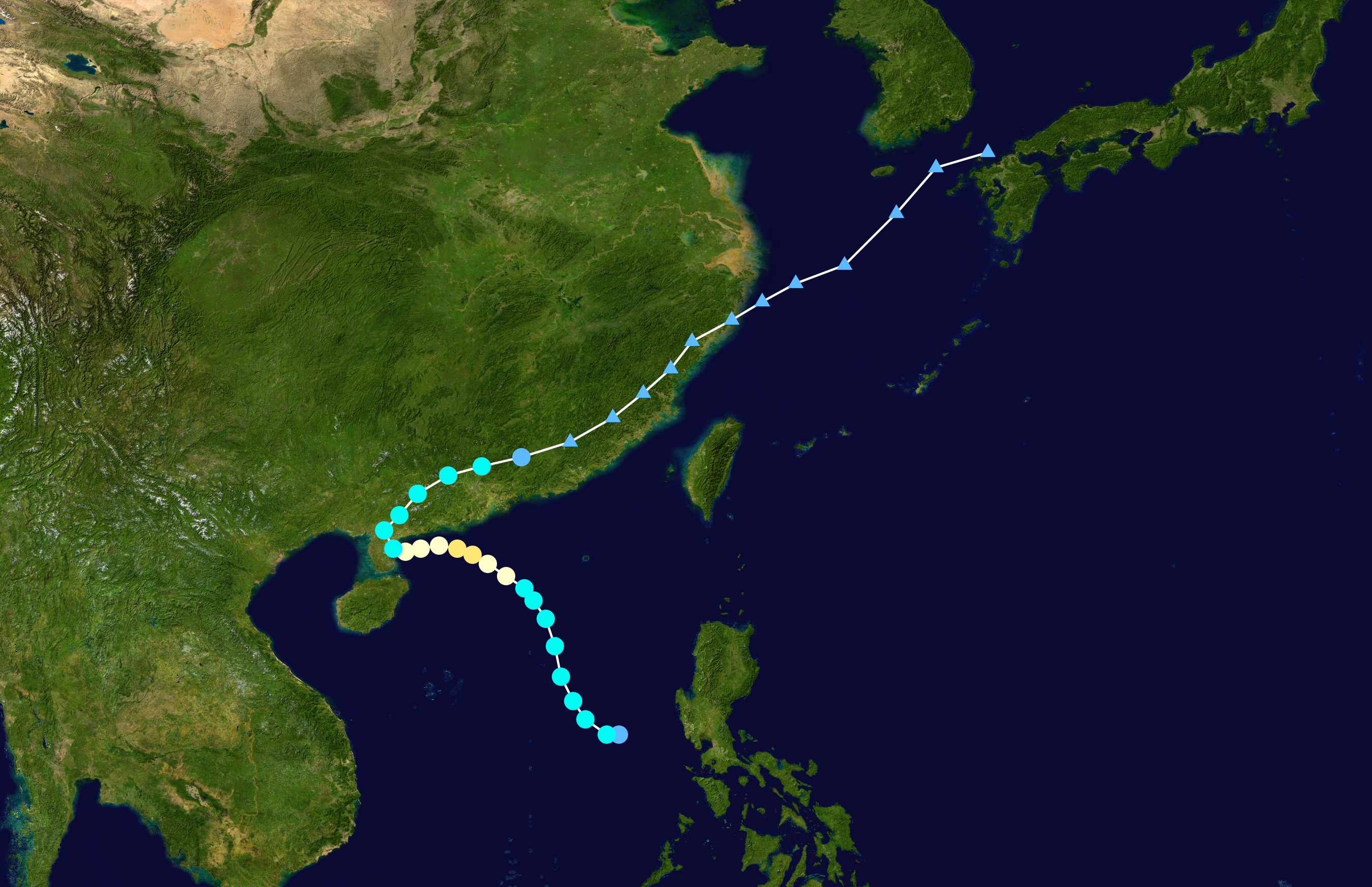
- Duration: June 10 – June 15
- Peak intensity: 155 km/h (100 mph) (1-min); 960 hPa (mbar)

Typhoon Charlotte formed on June 10, near the Philippines. It then strengthened and made landfall as a minimal typhoon near Hong Kong before dissipating on June 15.

=== Typhoon Dinah ===
- Typhoon (JMA)
- Category 1 typhoon (SSHWS)
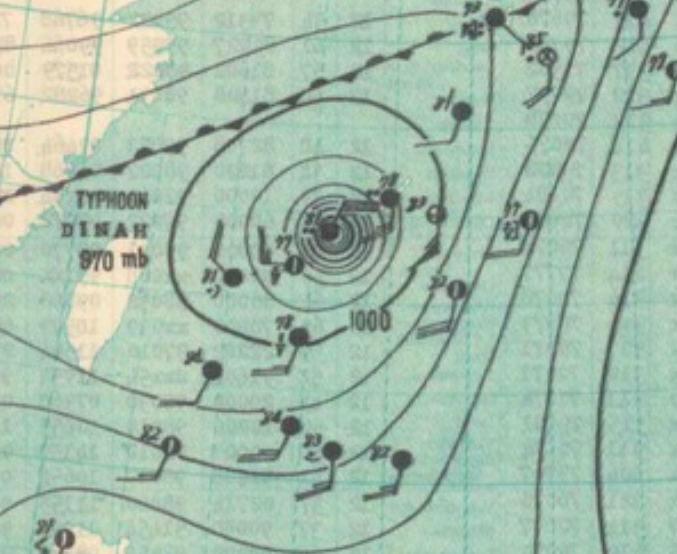
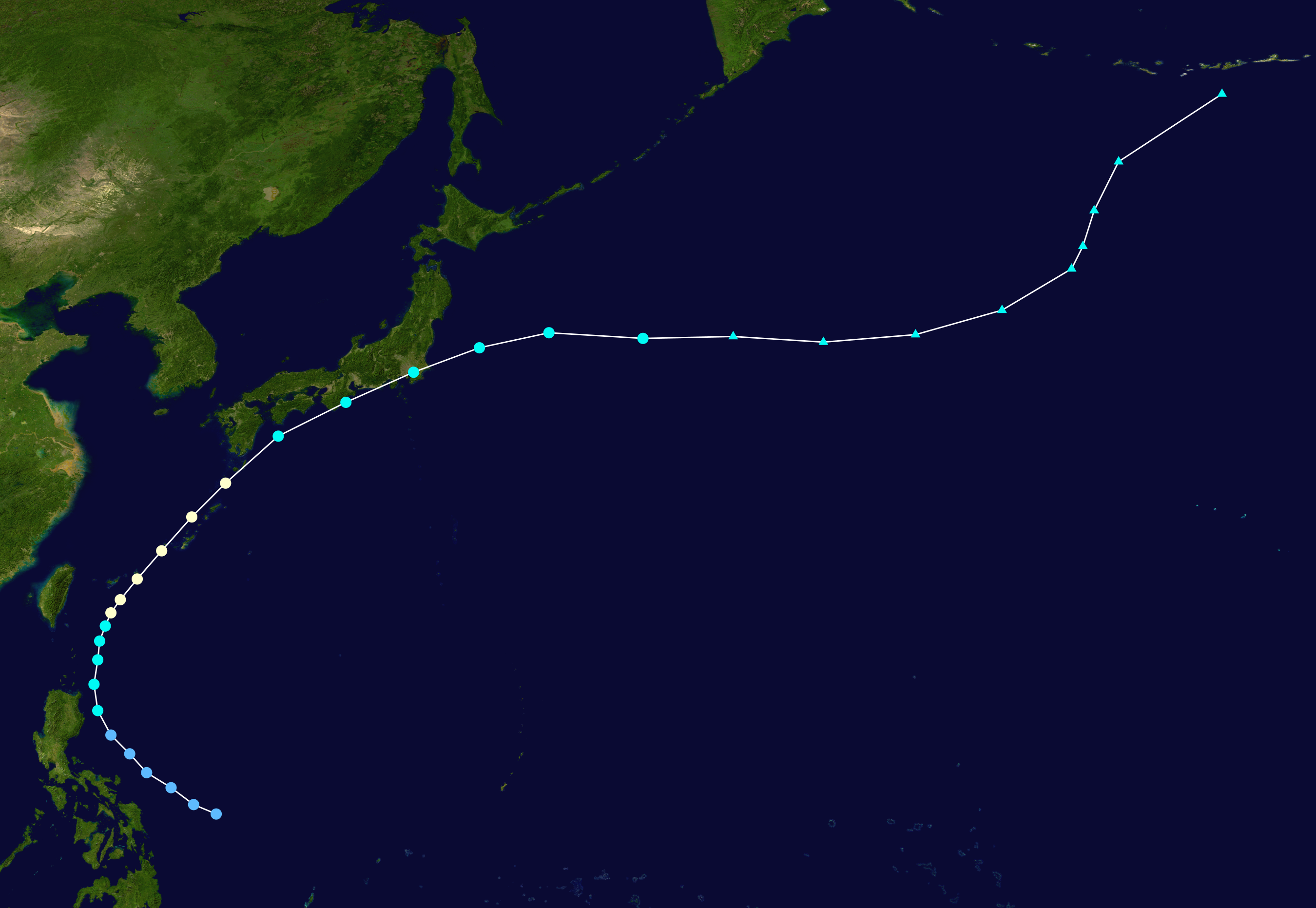
- Duration: June 19 – June 25
- Peak intensity: 140 km/h (85 mph) (1-min); 960 hPa (mbar)

On June 23, Dinah struck to the west of the Kanto Region in Japan. 65 people were killed and 70 were missing.

=== Typhoon Emma ===
- Typhoon (JMA)
- Category 3 typhoon (SSHWS)
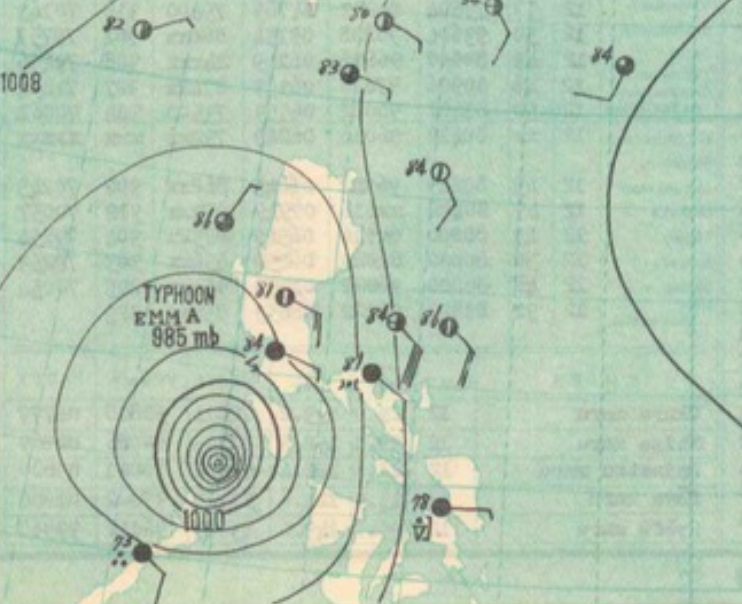
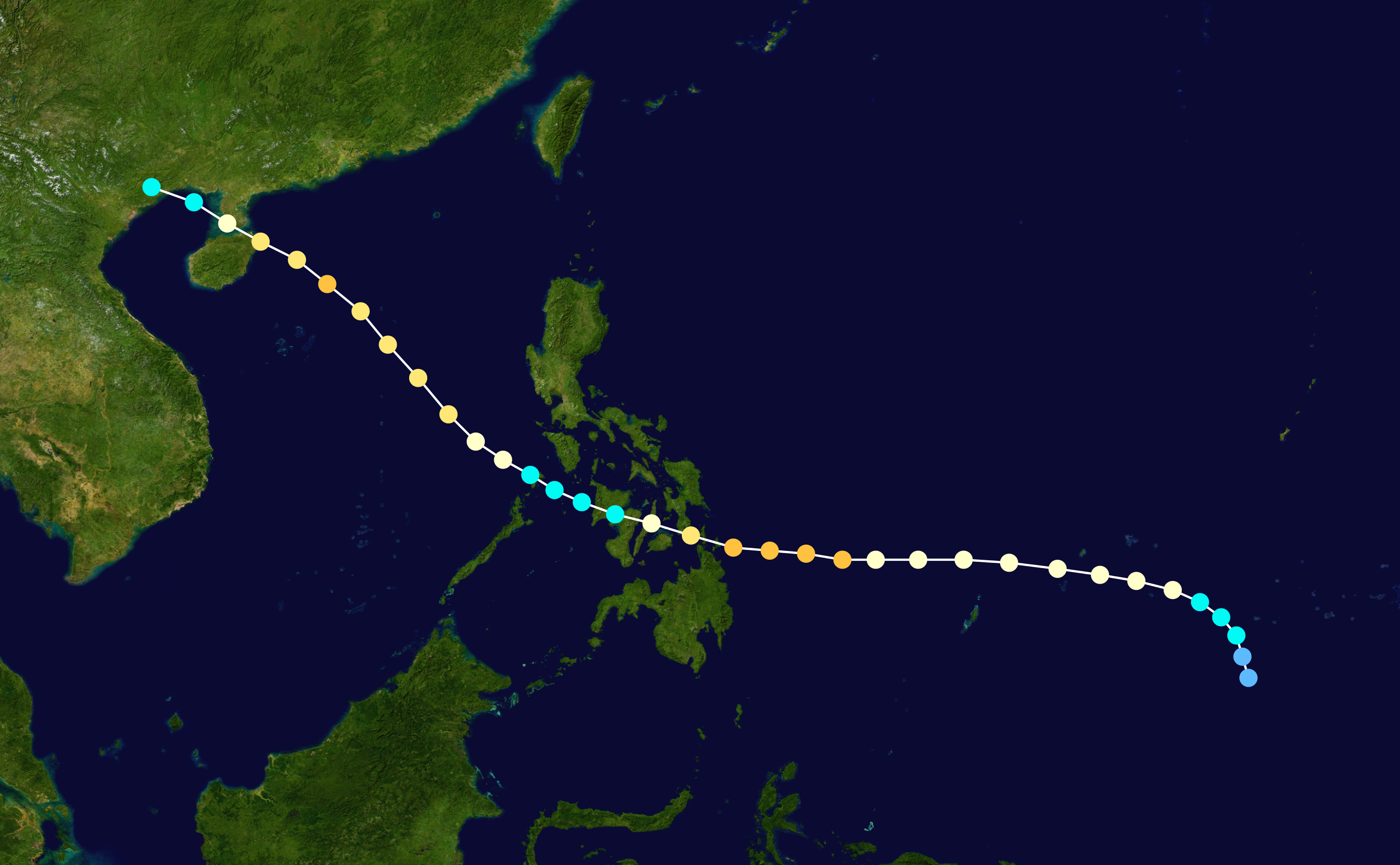
- Duration: June 28 – July 6
- Peak intensity: 205 km/h (125 mph) (1-min); 973 hPa (mbar)

Typhoon Emma hit the Philippines and South China, especially Hainan Island.

=== Tropical Storm Freda ===
- Tropical storm (JMA)
- Tropical storm (SSHWS)
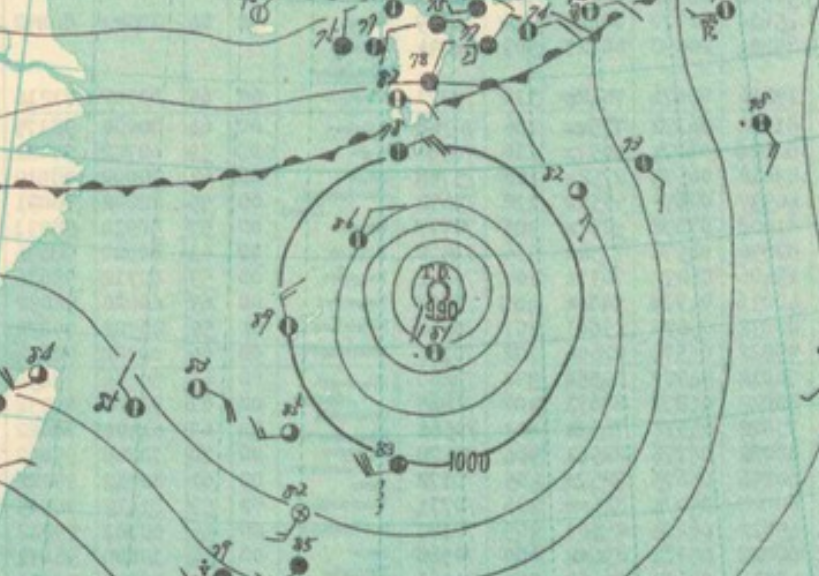
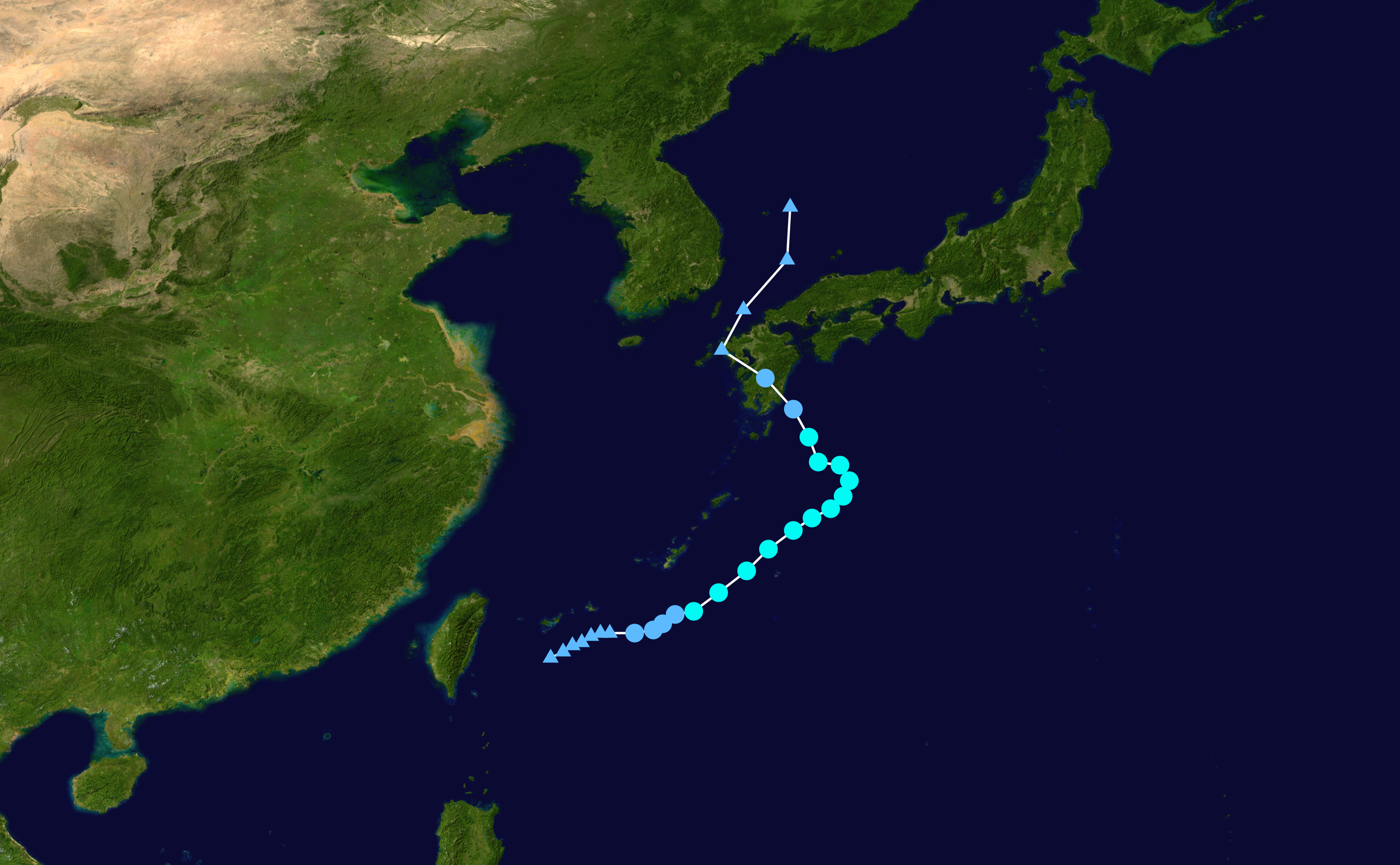
- Duration: July 11 – July 15
- Peak intensity: 85 km/h (50 mph) (1-min); 995 hPa (mbar)

Freda weakened to a tropical depression before hitting Kyushu.

=== Tropical Storm Gilda ===
- Tropical storm (JMA)
- Tropical storm (SSHWS)
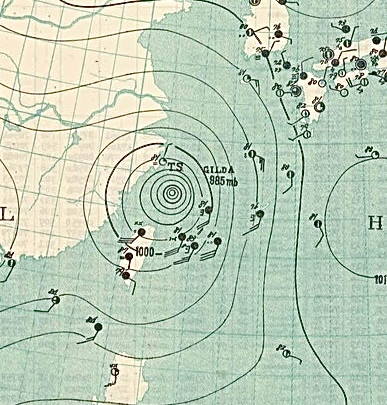
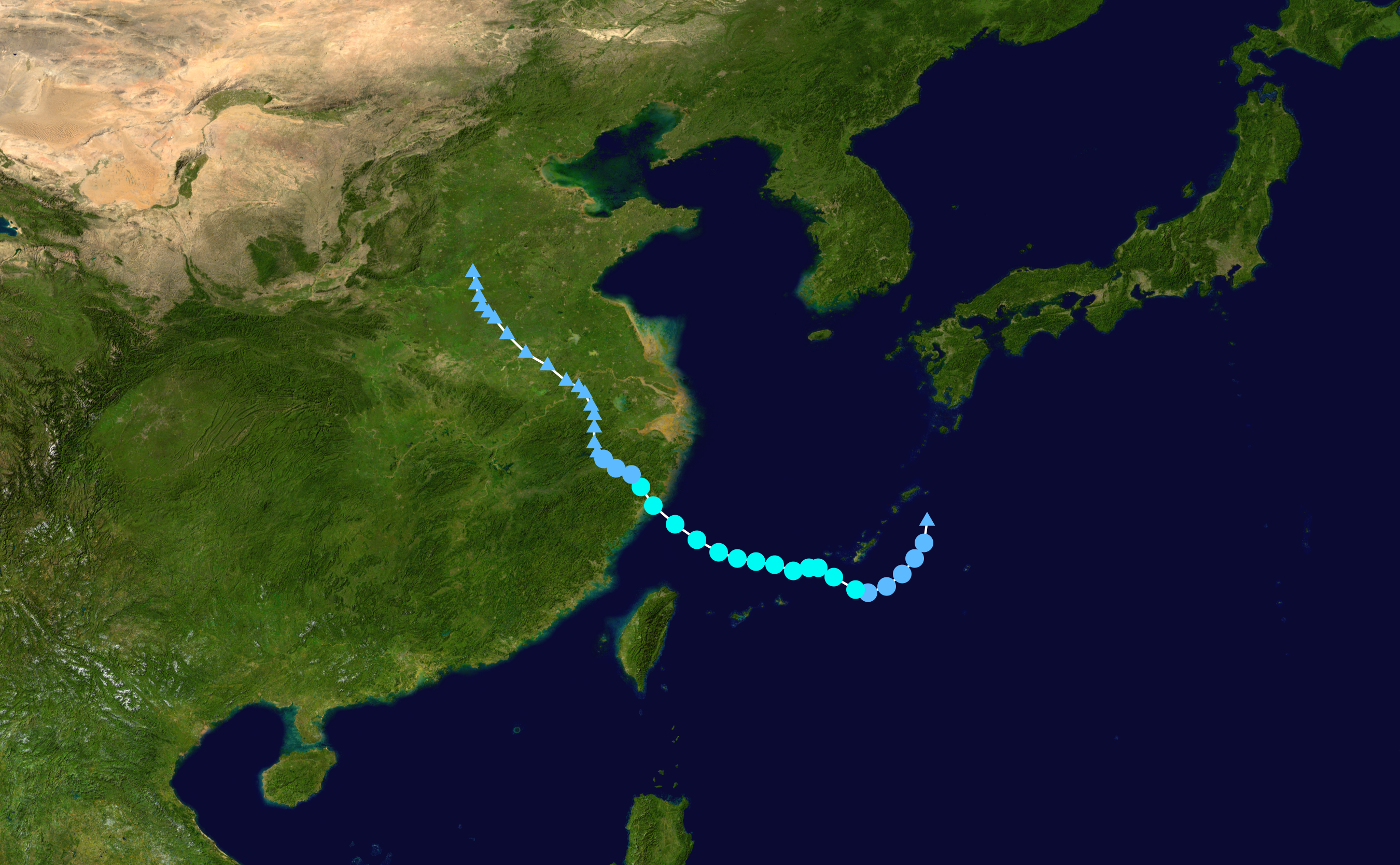
- Duration: July 15 – July 20
- Peak intensity: 95 km/h (60 mph) (1-min); 990 hPa (mbar)

Tropical Storm Gilda hit China as a tropical storm.

=== Typhoon Harriet ===
- Typhoon (JMA)
- Category 3 typhoon (SSHWS)
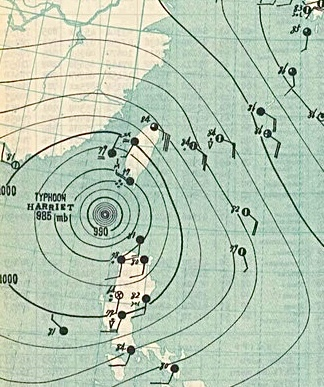
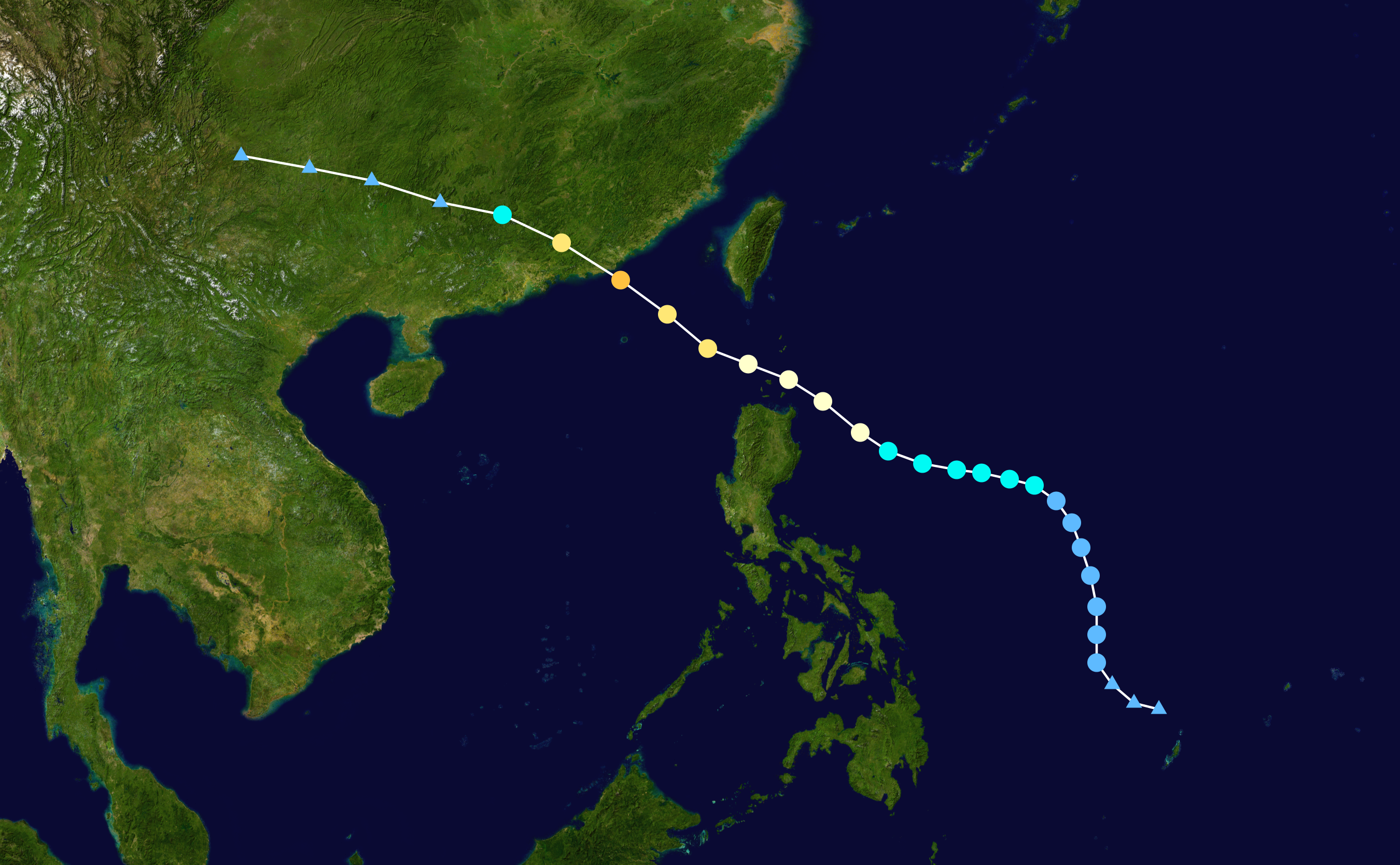
- Duration: July 26 – July 30
- Peak intensity: 185 km/h (115 mph) (1-min); 980 hPa (mbar)

Harriet hit China as a Category 3 typhoon, with winds of 115 mph (185 km/h).

=== Tropical Storm Ivy ===
- Tropical storm (JMA)
- Tropical storm (SSHWS)
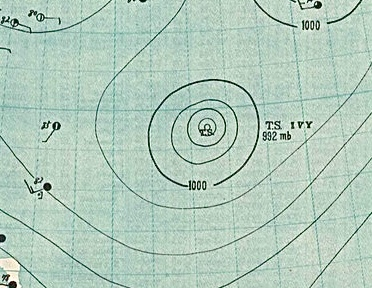
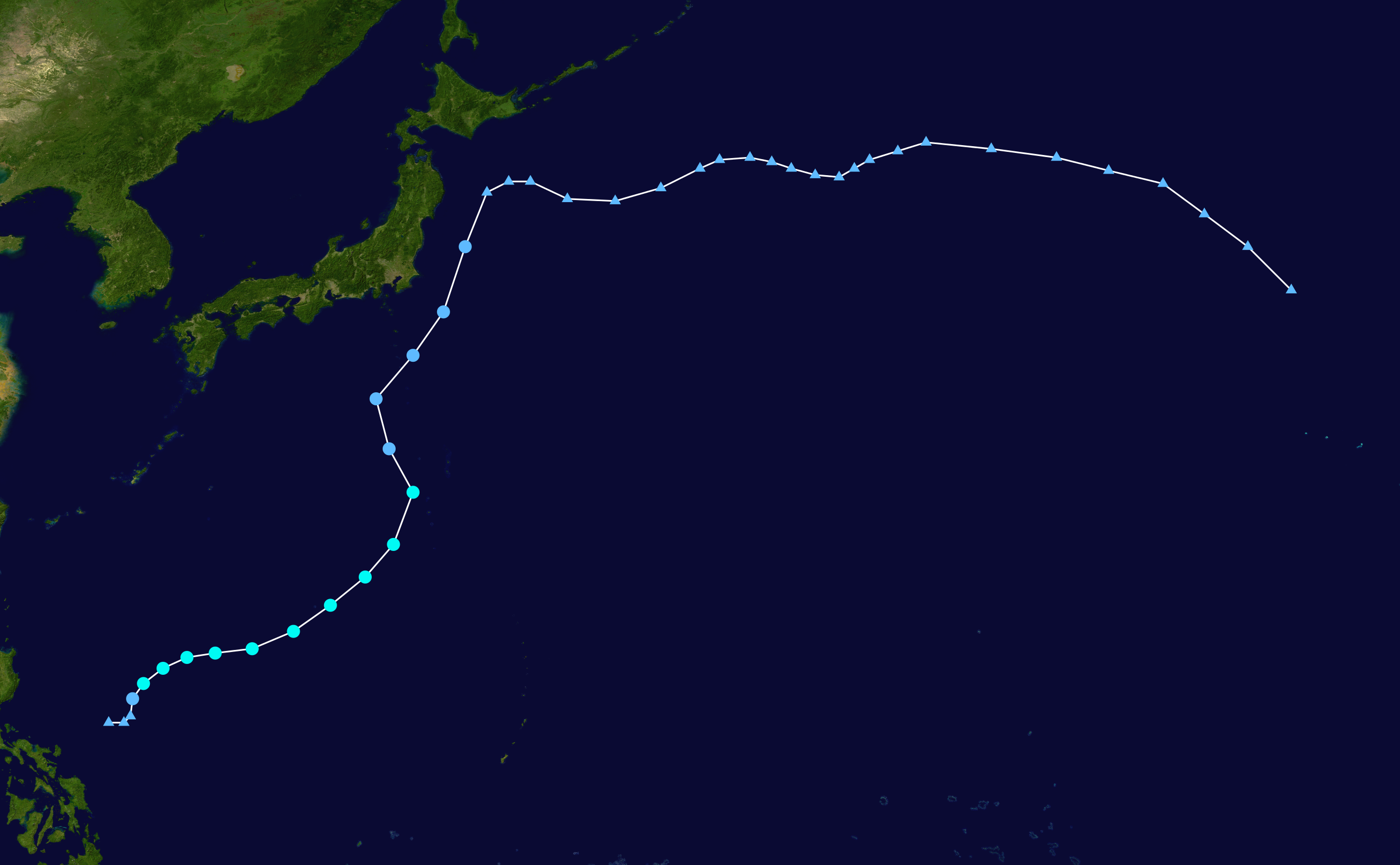
- Duration: August 2 – August 8
- Peak intensity: 85 km/h (50 mph) (1-min); 990 hPa (mbar)

Ivy stayed out at sea, causing no damage.

=== Tropical Storm Jeanne ===
- Tropical storm (JMA)
- Tropical storm (SSHWS)
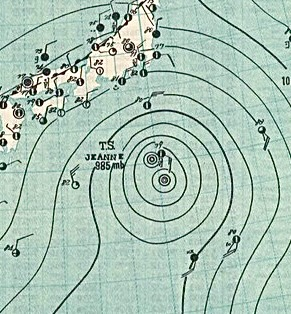
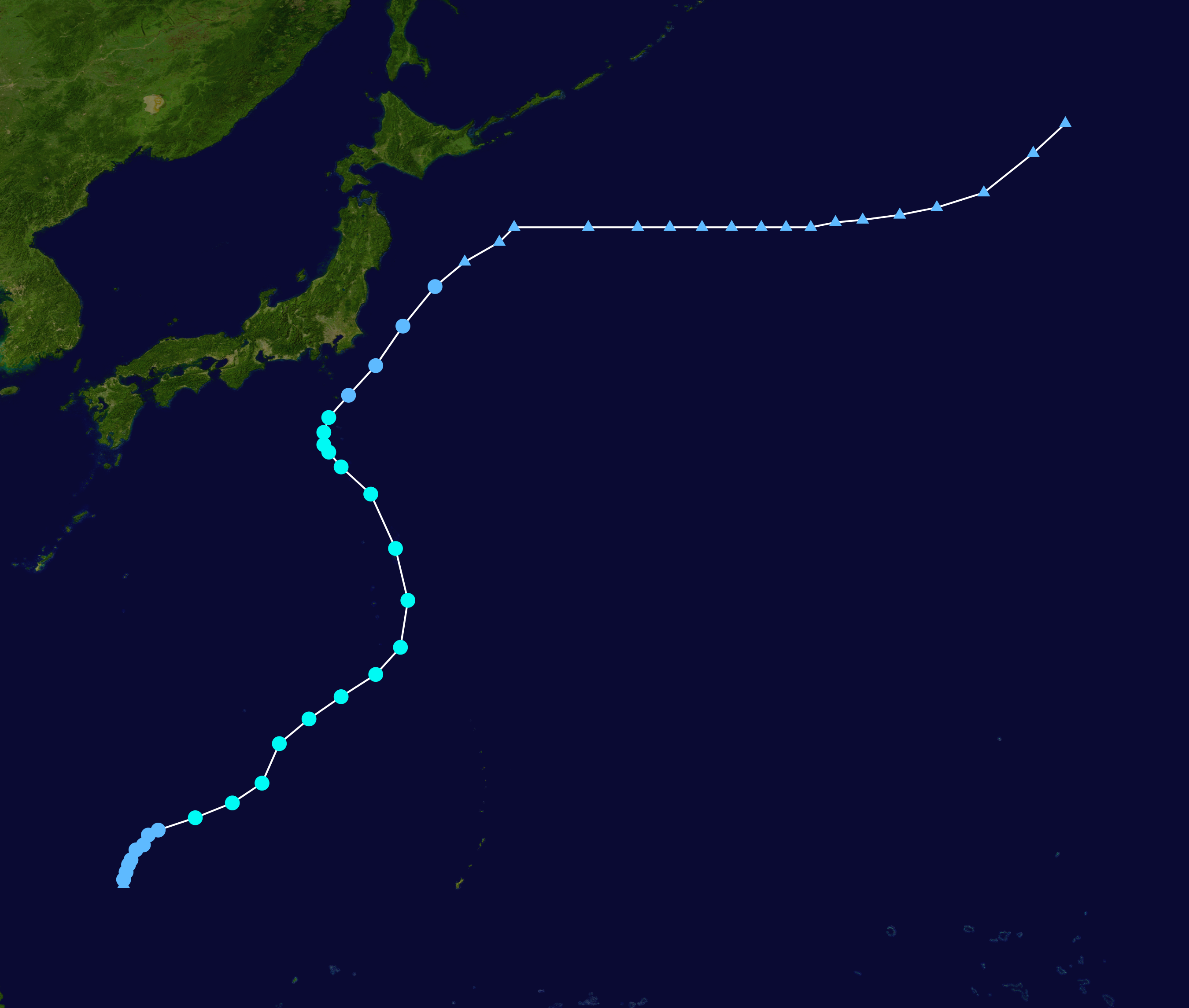
- Duration: August 4 – August 7
- Peak intensity: 75 km/h (45 mph) (1-min); 985 hPa (mbar)

Jeanne was a tropical storm that existed from August 4 to August 7.

=== Typhoon Karen ===
- Typhoon (JMA)
- Category 2 typhoon (SSHWS)
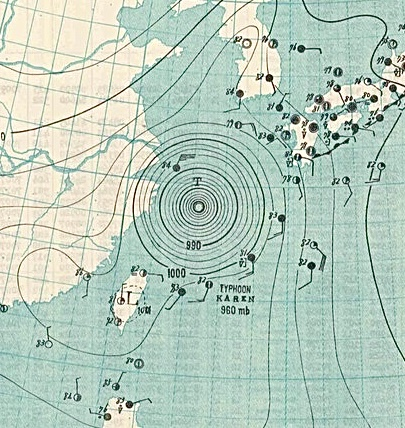
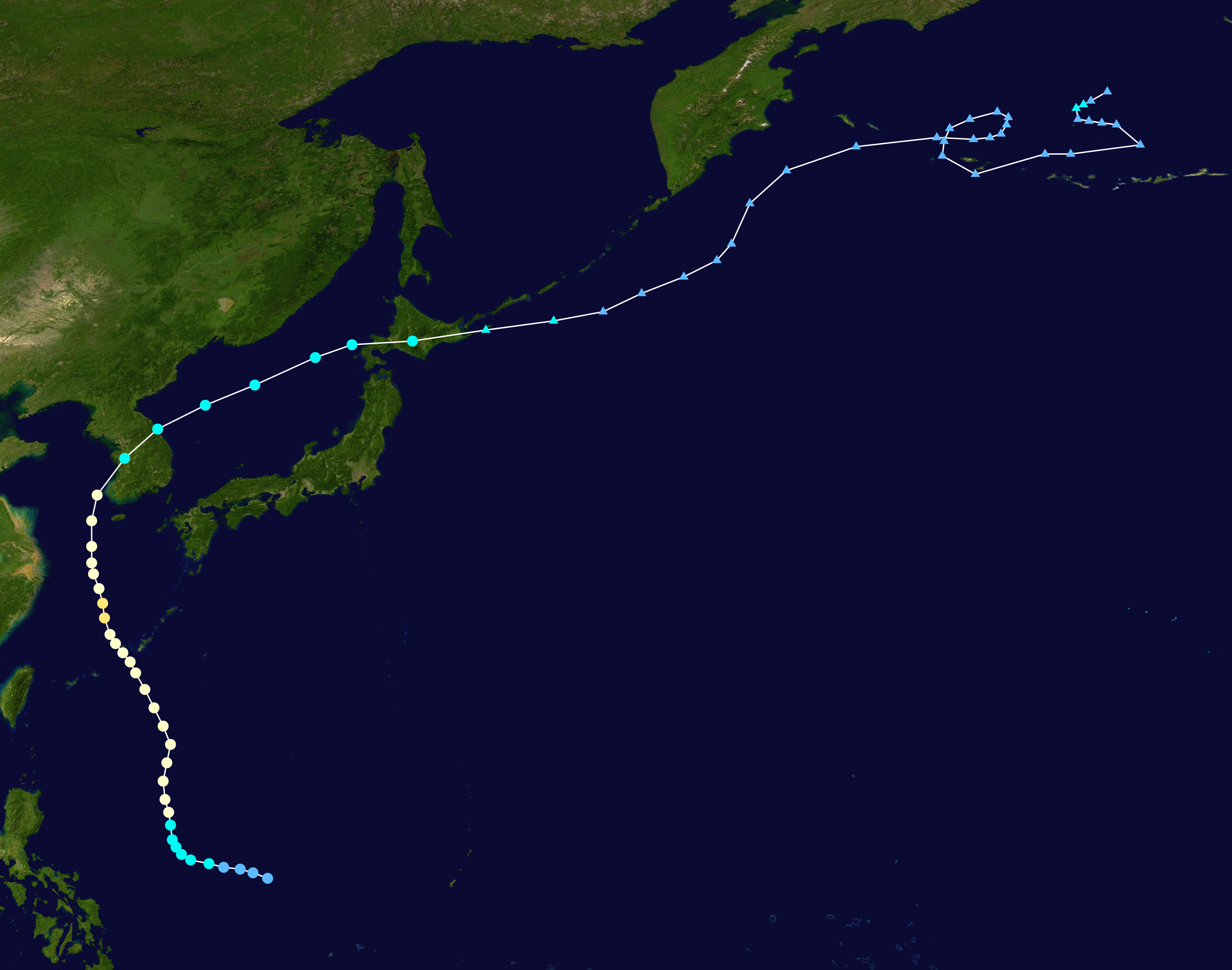
- Duration: August 10 – August 20
- Peak intensity: 155 km/h (100 mph) (1-min); 955 hPa (mbar)

Typhoon Karen struck land, mostly Korea and Japan.

=== Typhoon Lois ===
- Typhoon (JMA)
- Category 1 typhoon (SSHWS)
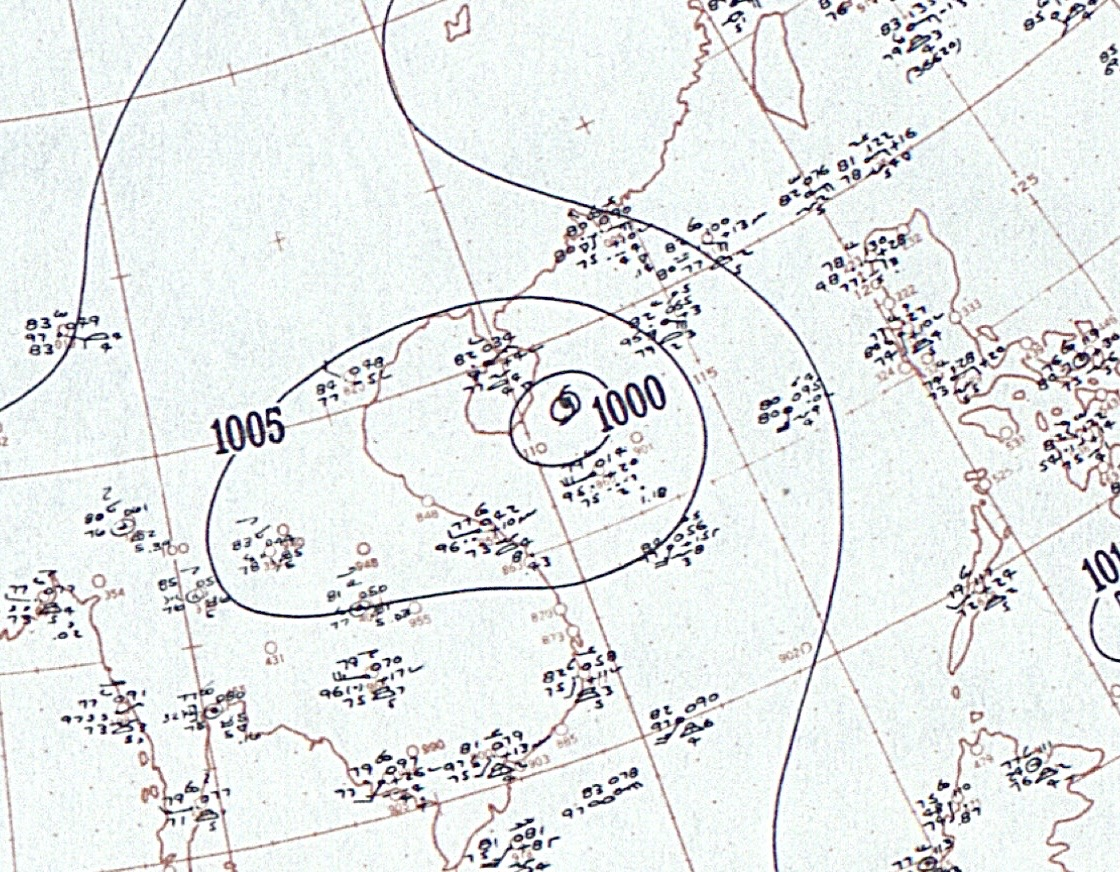
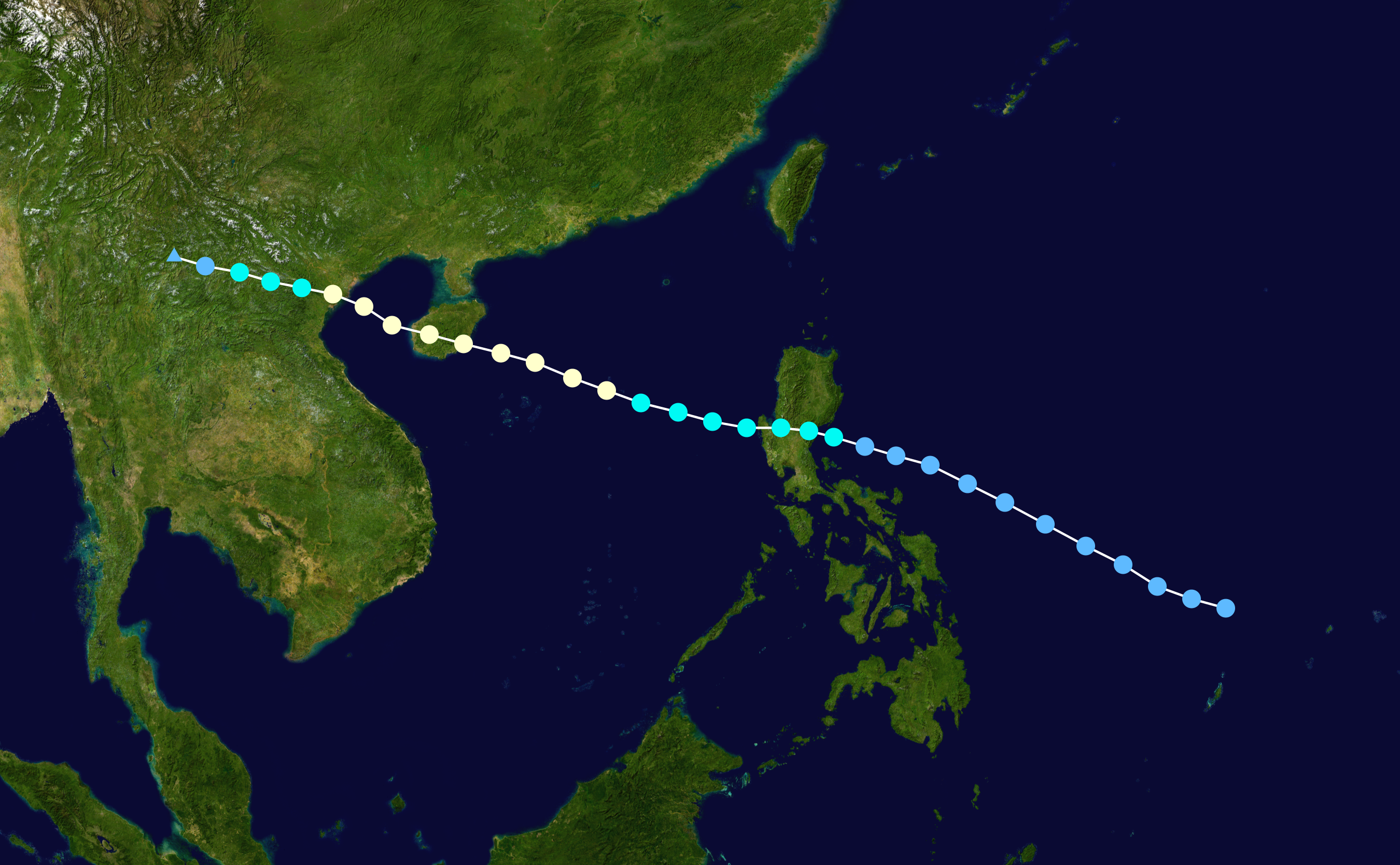
- Duration: August 22 – August 30
- Peak intensity: 140 km/h (85 mph) (1-min); 975 hPa (mbar)

Lois formed east of the Philippines on August 22. It moved northwestward, and hit Luzon as a tropical storm. As it entered the South China Sea, Lois intensified into a category 1 typhoon. It hit China and Vietnam before dissipating on August 30.

=== Typhoon Mary ===
- Typhoon (JMA)
- Category 1 typhoon (SSHWS)
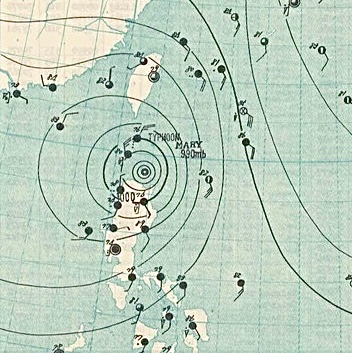
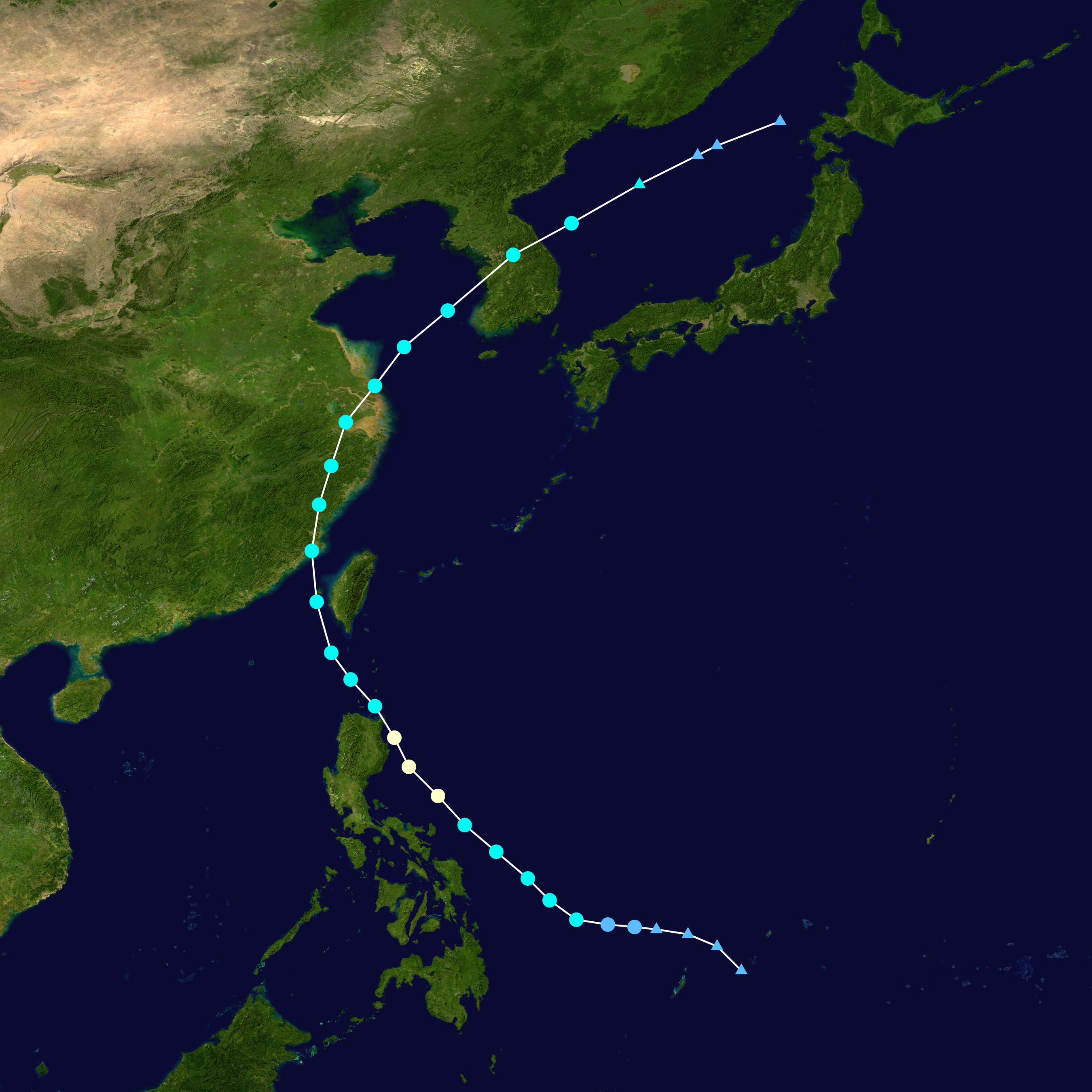
- Duration: August 29 – September 4
- Peak intensity: 120 km/h (75 mph) (1-min); 985 hPa (mbar)

Mary hit the Philippines as a category 1 typhoon and later hit China and Korea as a tropical storm.

=== Typhoon Nona ===
- Typhoon (JMA)
- Category 1 typhoon (SSHWS)
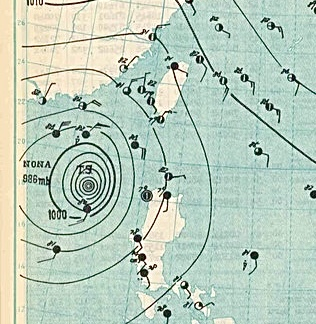
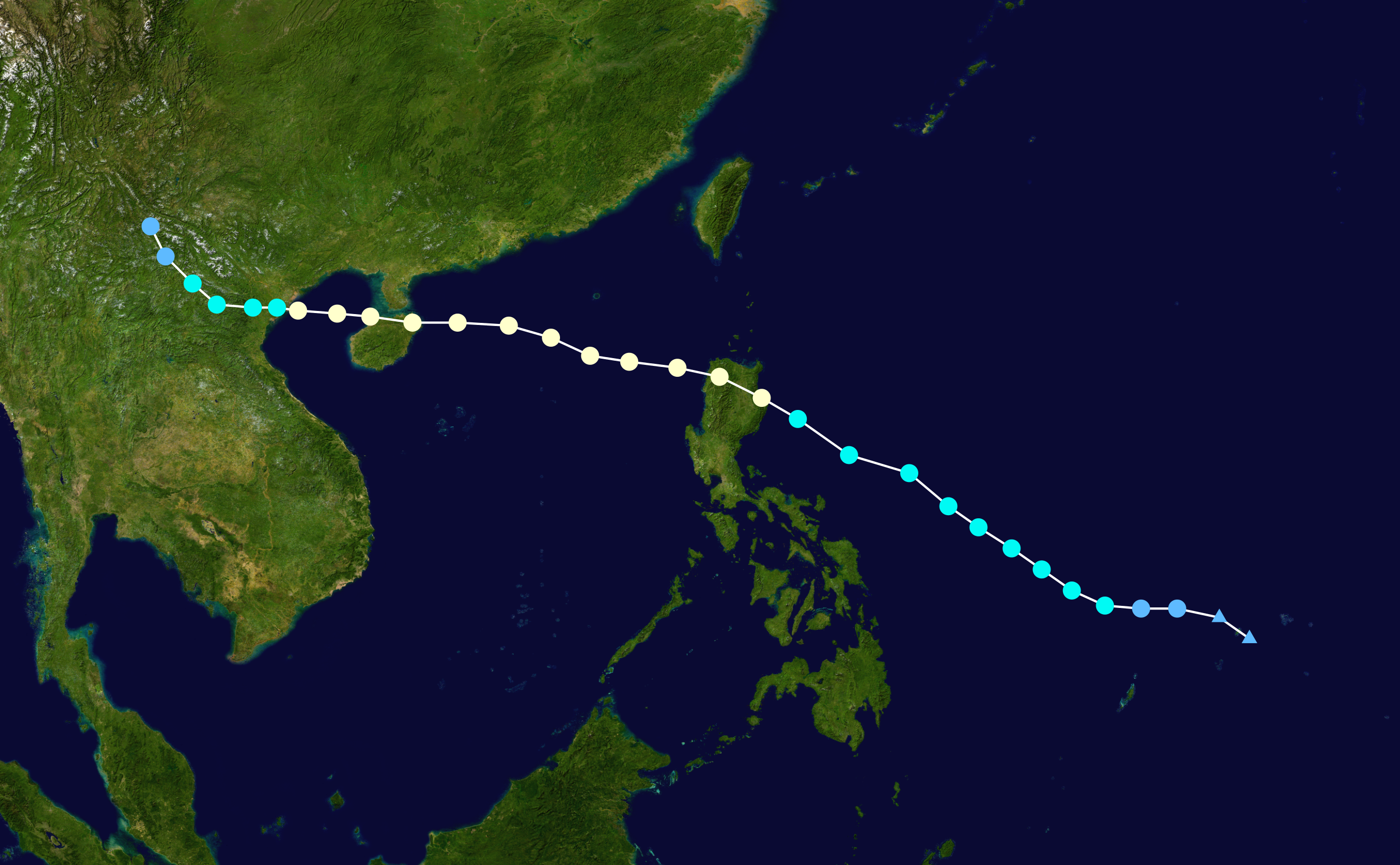
- Duration: September 2 – September 8
- Peak intensity: 150 km/h (90 mph) (1-min); 980 hPa (mbar)

Nona formed on September 2. It hit the Philippines and China as a category 1 typhoon and hit Vietnam as a tropical strom before dissipating inland on September 8.

=== Tropical Storm 12W ===
- Tropical depression (JMA)
- Tropical storm (SSHWS)
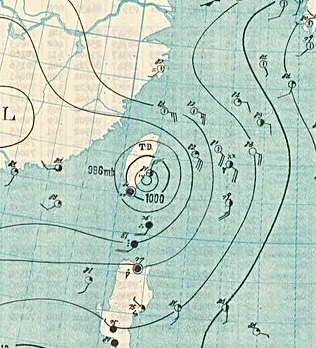
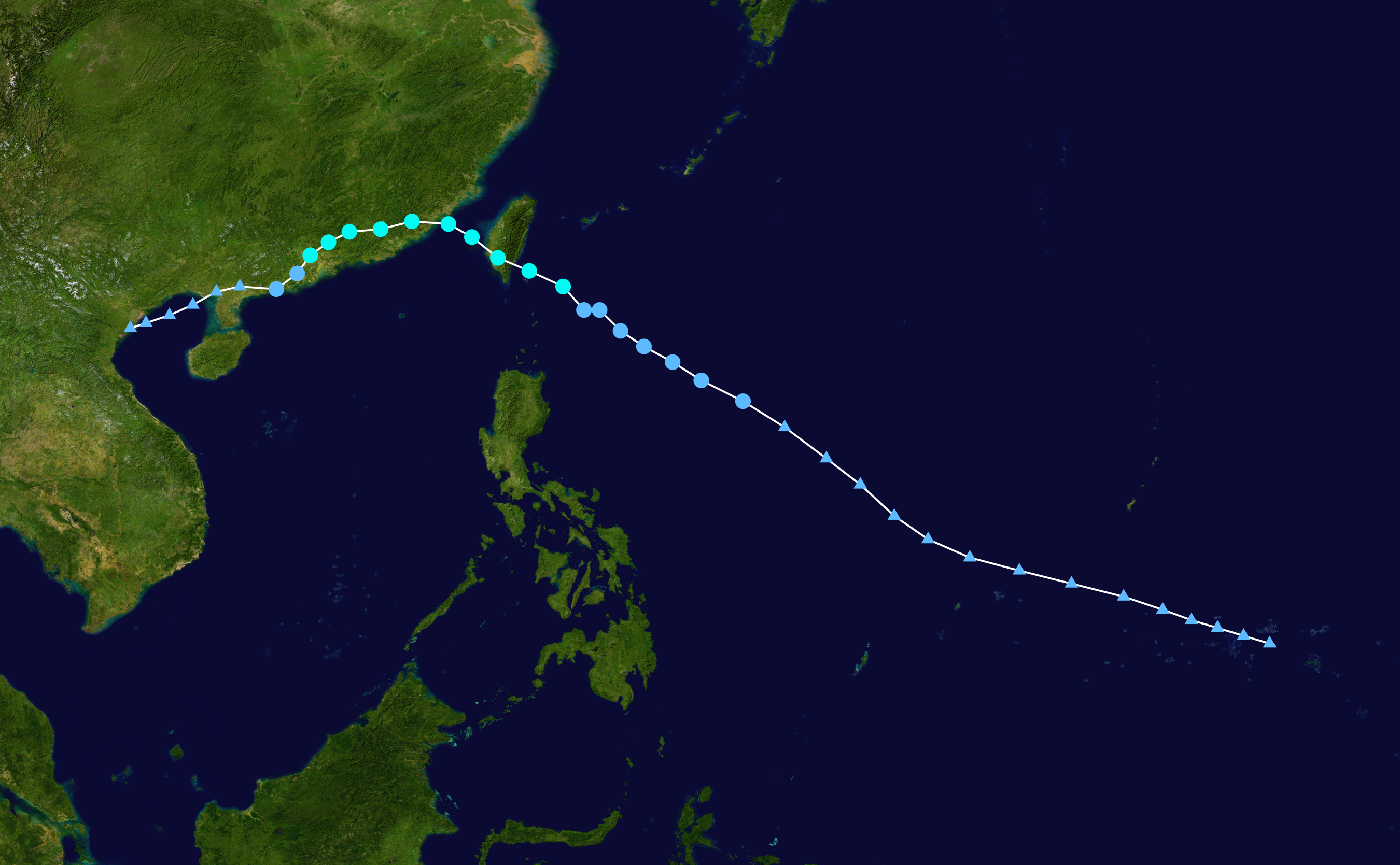
- Duration: September 7 – September 14
- Peak intensity: 75 km/h (45 mph) (1-min); 995 hPa (mbar)

12W was a weak tropical storm that hit China.

=== Super Typhoon Olive ===
- Typhoon (JMA)
- Category 5 super typhoon (SSHWS)
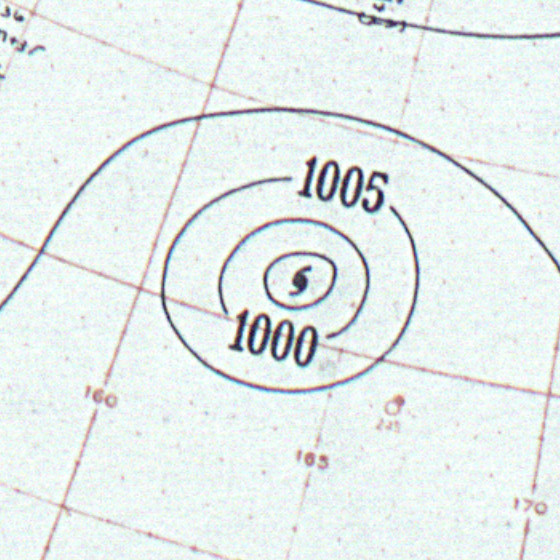
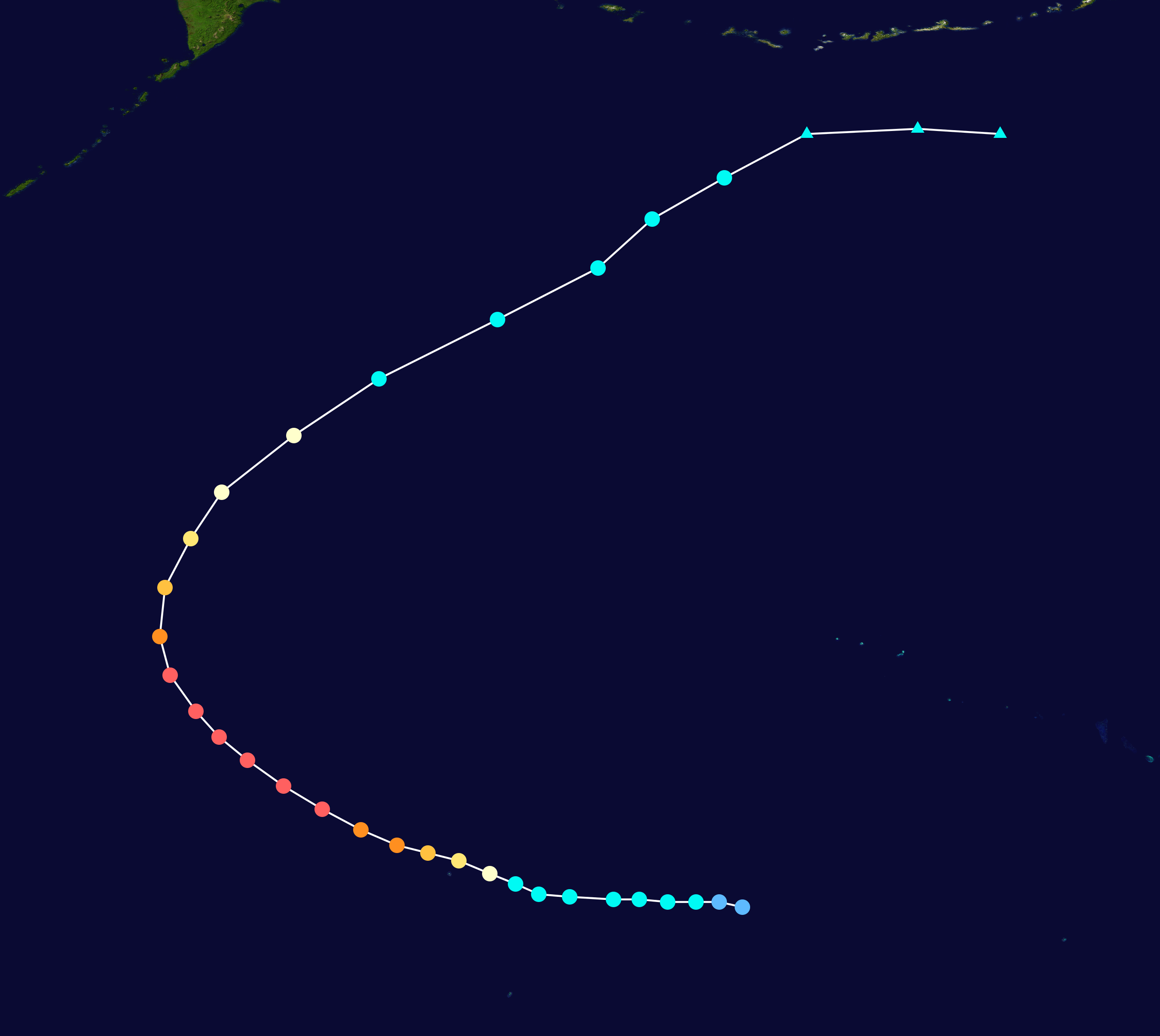
- Duration: September 13 – September 21
- Peak intensity: 295 km/h (185 mph) (1-min); 920 hPa (mbar)

On September 8, an area of disturbed weather, located near 12.0°N 169.0°W, was plotted as a tropical wave on surface weather maps. Operationally, however, the system was not classified as a tropical storm until September 15; postseason analysis determined that the system acquired tropical storm intensity at 00:00 UTC on September 15. Tropical Storm Olive, moving west-northwest near 10 mph (16 km/h), turned toward Wake Island on September 15. Around 18:00 UTC Olive was upgraded to a typhoon, with winds of 75 mph (121 km/h). Continuing to intensify, Olive passed near Wake Island, where maximum sustained winds of 127 mph (204 km/h) were recorded. Around this time, reconnaissance aircraft reported a minimum central pressure of 945 mbar (hPa; 27.91 inHg). On September 16, Olive intensified from a Category 2 to a Category 4 typhoon, attained the equivalence of super typhoon intensity, and strengthened to a peak intensity of 185 mph (298 km/h) the following day far from land. On September 18, Olive weakened from a Category 5 to a Category 2 typhoon and recurved northeast. On September 19, the cyclone lost typhoon intensity. Tropical Storm Olive transitioned into an extratropical cyclone and was last monitored on September 21.

On Wake Island, 750 people sheltered in World War II military bunkers. Olive, the second typhoon to affect the island since 1935, produced sustained wind speeds of 120 mph (190 km/h) and peak gusts of 142 mph (229 km/h) on the island. Significant flooding was also recorded. Damage was severe; it is estimated that 85% of the island's structures were demolished due to the storm. All of the homes and the island's hotel were destroyed. Additionally, the island's chapel and quonset huts were destroyed. The island's LORAN station, operated by the United States Coast Guard, was also destroyed. On September 18, water and power services were restored. The facilities on the island were fully restored in 1953. The total cost to repair damages caused by Olive amounted to $1.6 million (1952 USD; $13 million 2009 USD). No fatalities occurred on the island, and four injuries were reported. None of the 230 Pan American World Airways employees received injuries.

=== Tropical Storm 14W ===
- Tropical depression (JMA)
- Tropical storm (SSHWS)
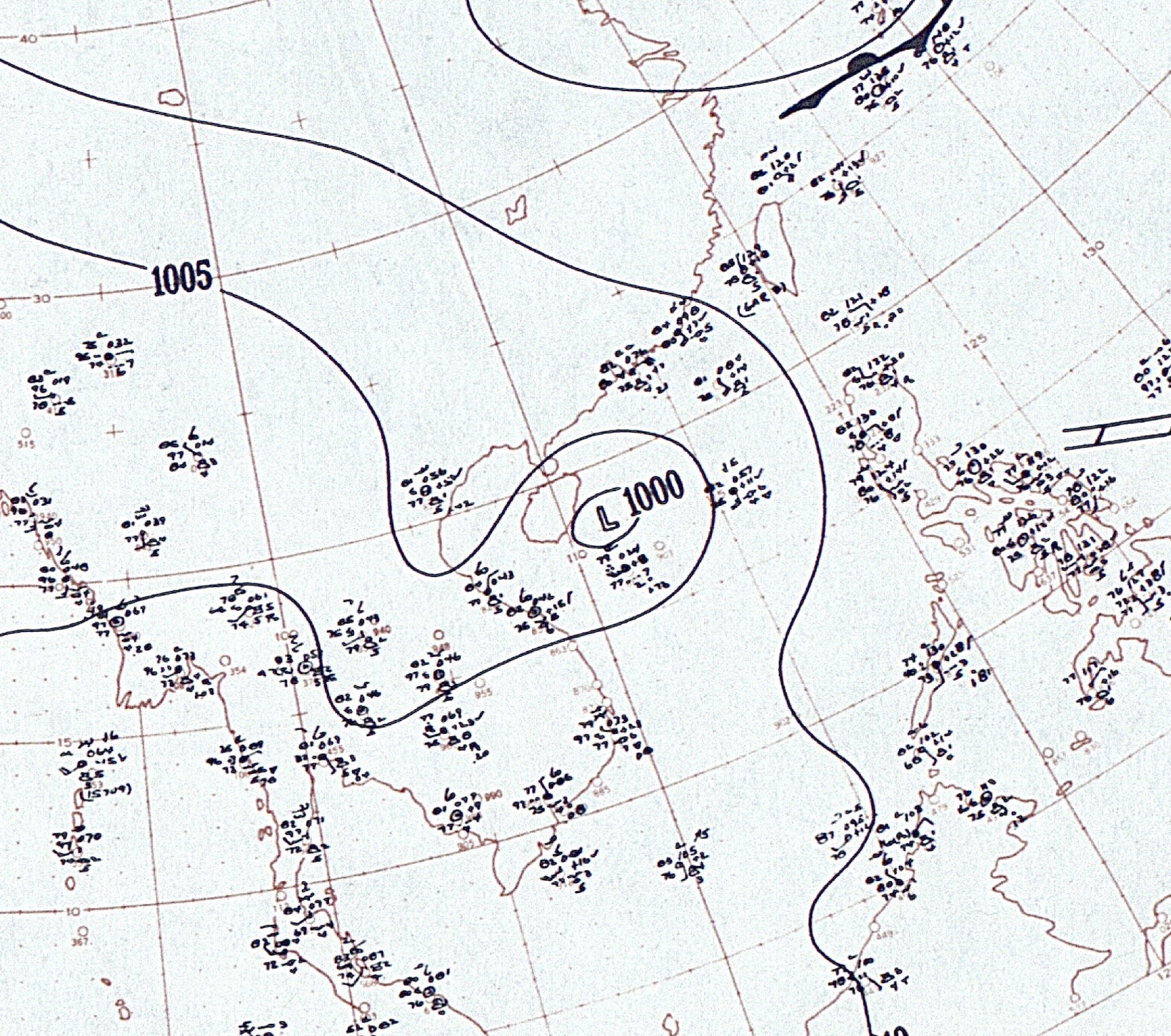
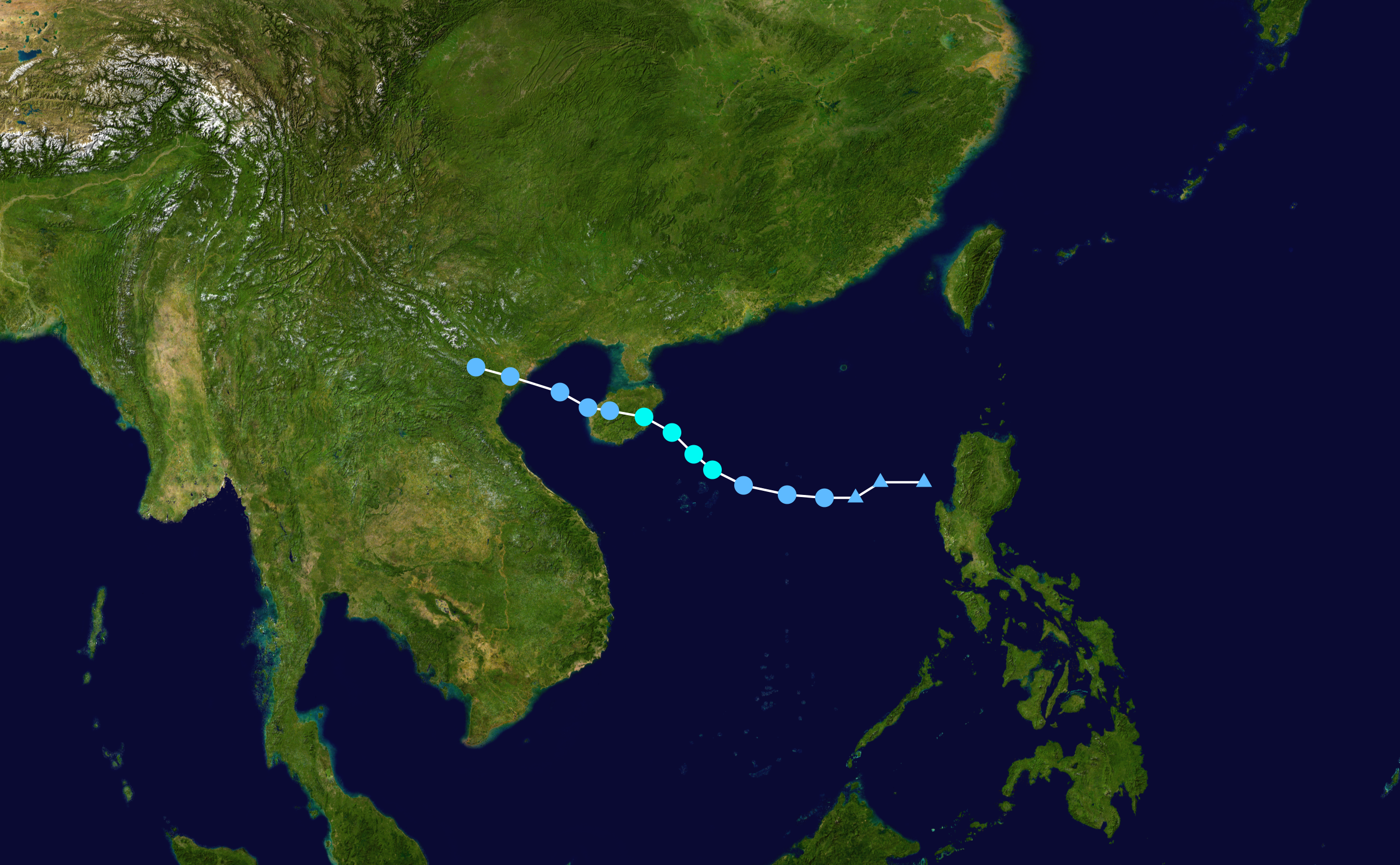
- Duration: September 16 – September 19
- Peak intensity: 65 km/h (40 mph) (1-min); 996 hPa (mbar)

14W hit Hainan, China as a tropical storm.

=== Typhoon Polly ===
- Typhoon (JMA)
- Category 1 typhoon (SSHWS)
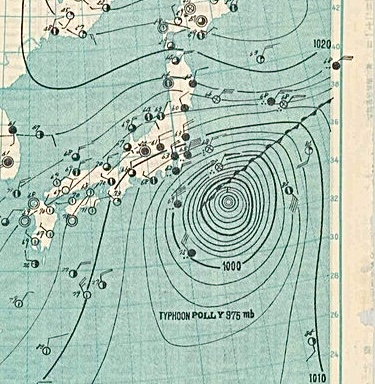
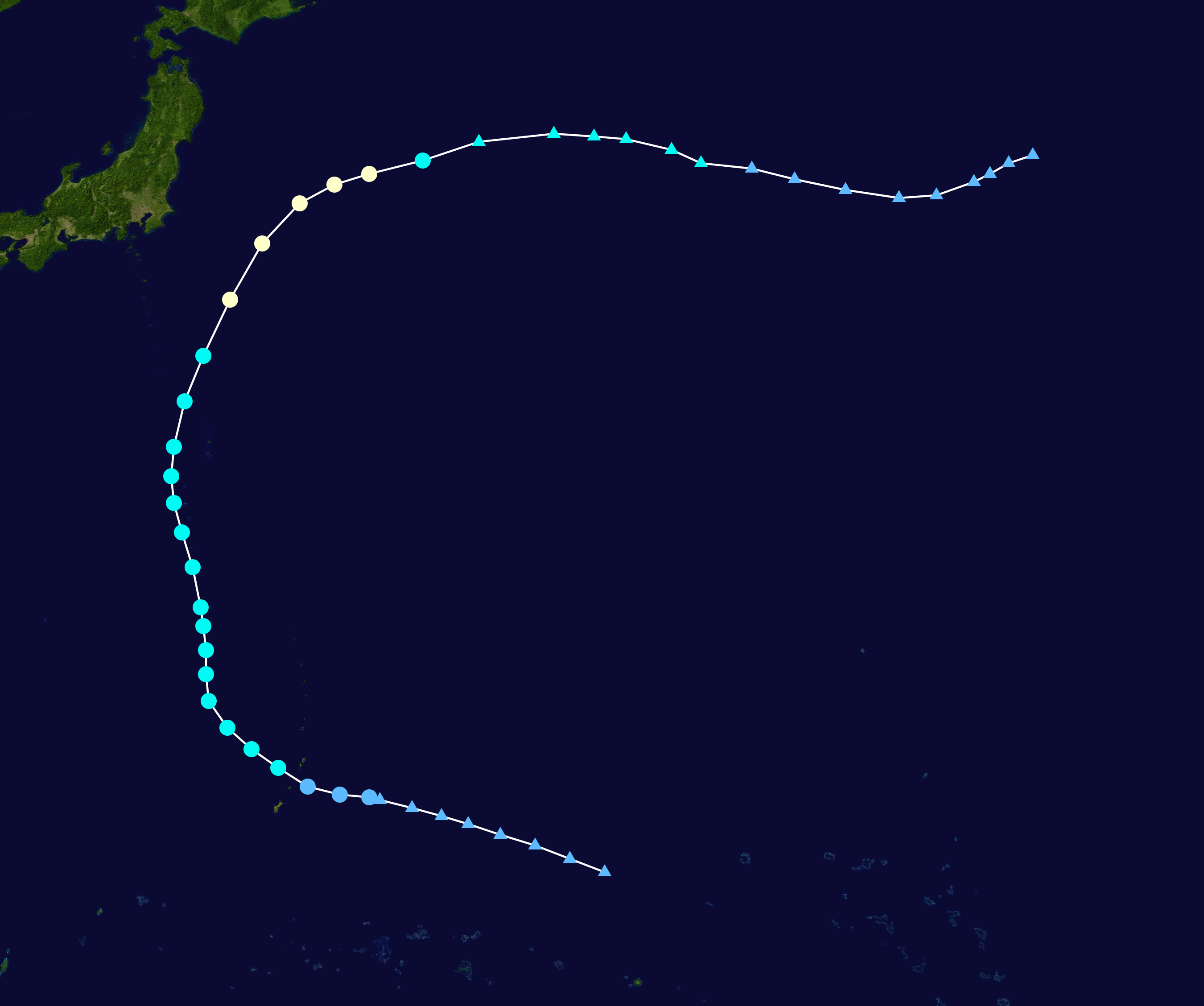
- Duration: September 26 – October 3
- Peak intensity: 130 km/h (80 mph) (1-min); 975 hPa (mbar)

Polly was a category 1 typhoon that didn't make landfall.

=== Typhoon Rose ===
- Typhoon (JMA)
- Category 1 typhoon (SSHWS)
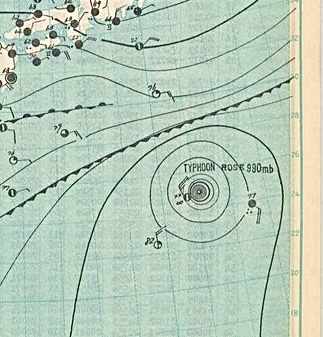
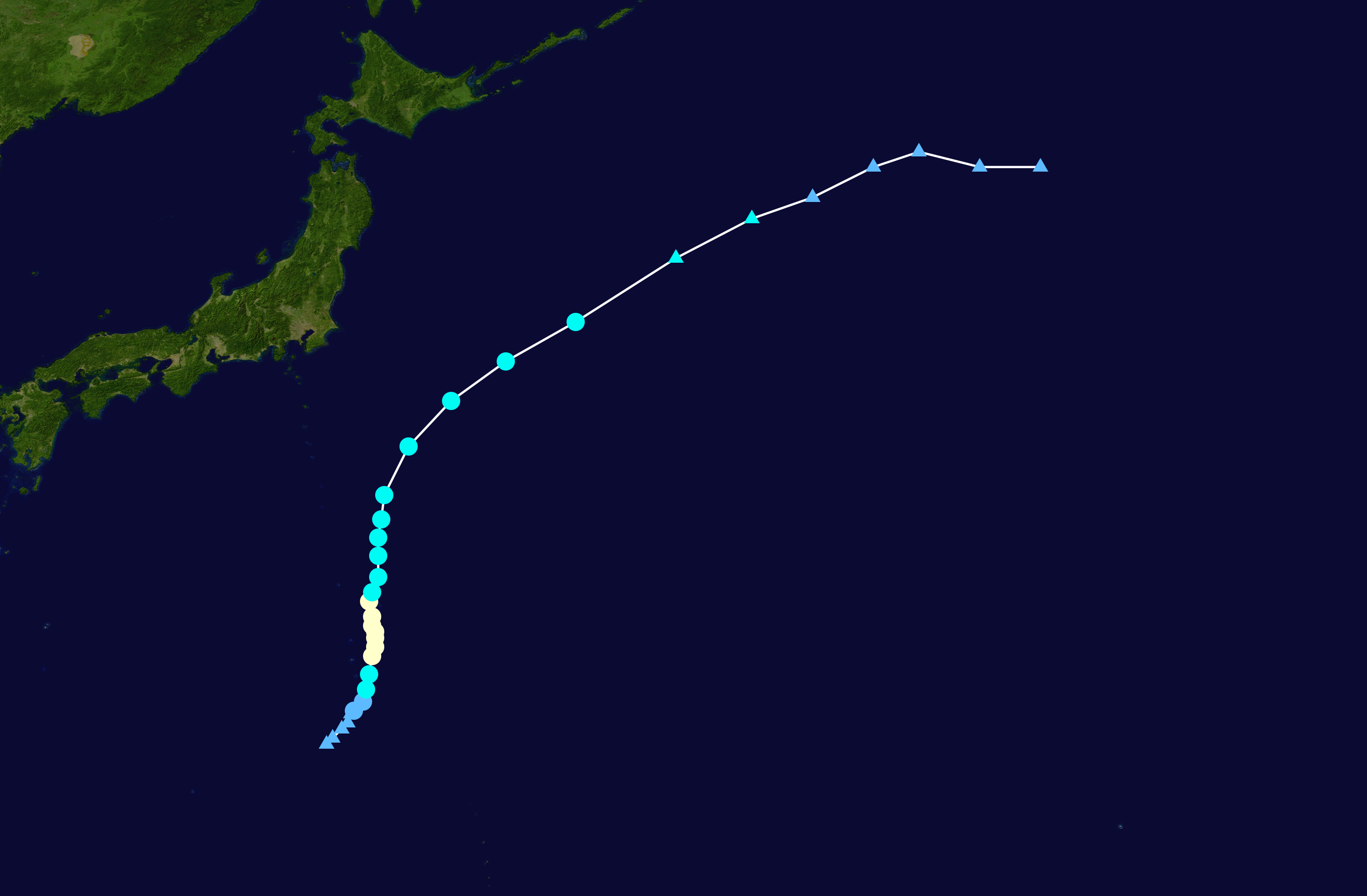
- Duration: October 4 – October 10
- Peak intensity: 150 km/h (90 mph) (1-min); 985 hPa (mbar)

Rose stayed out at sea.

=== Tropical Storm Shirley ===
- Tropical storm (JMA)
- Tropical storm (SSHWS)
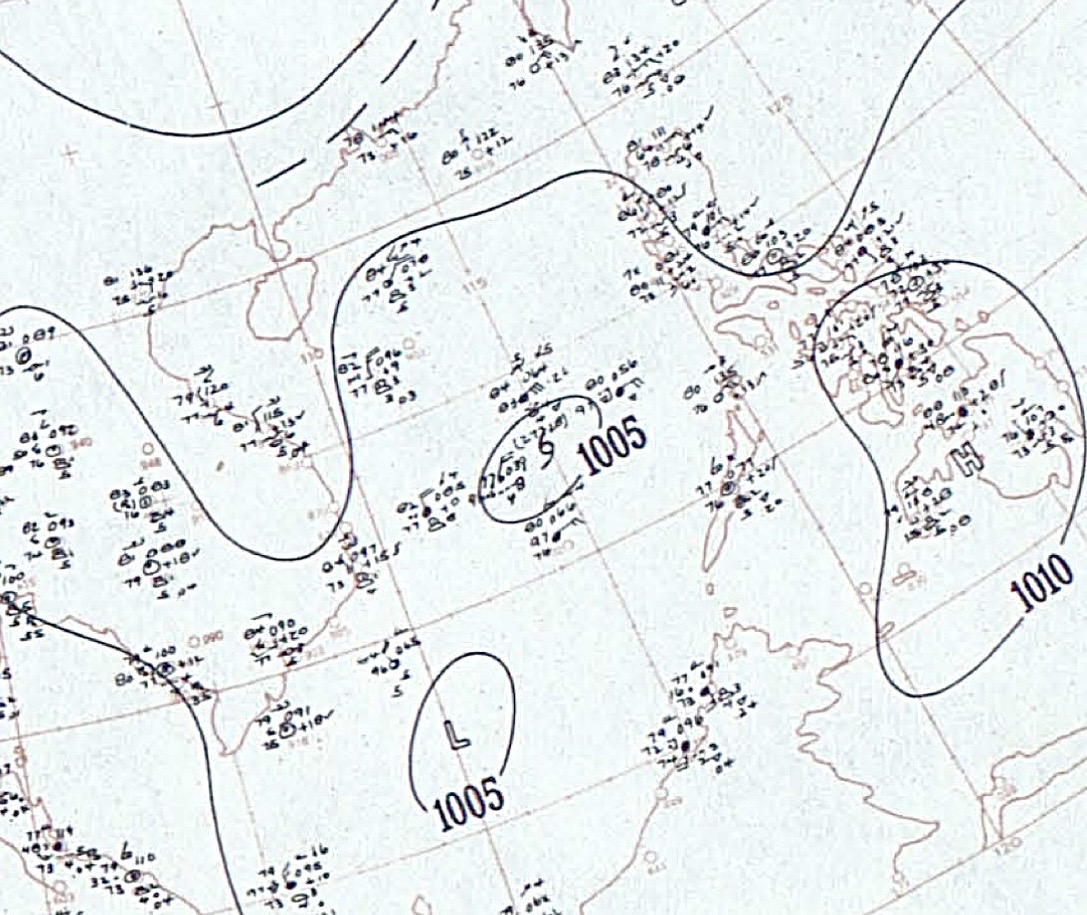
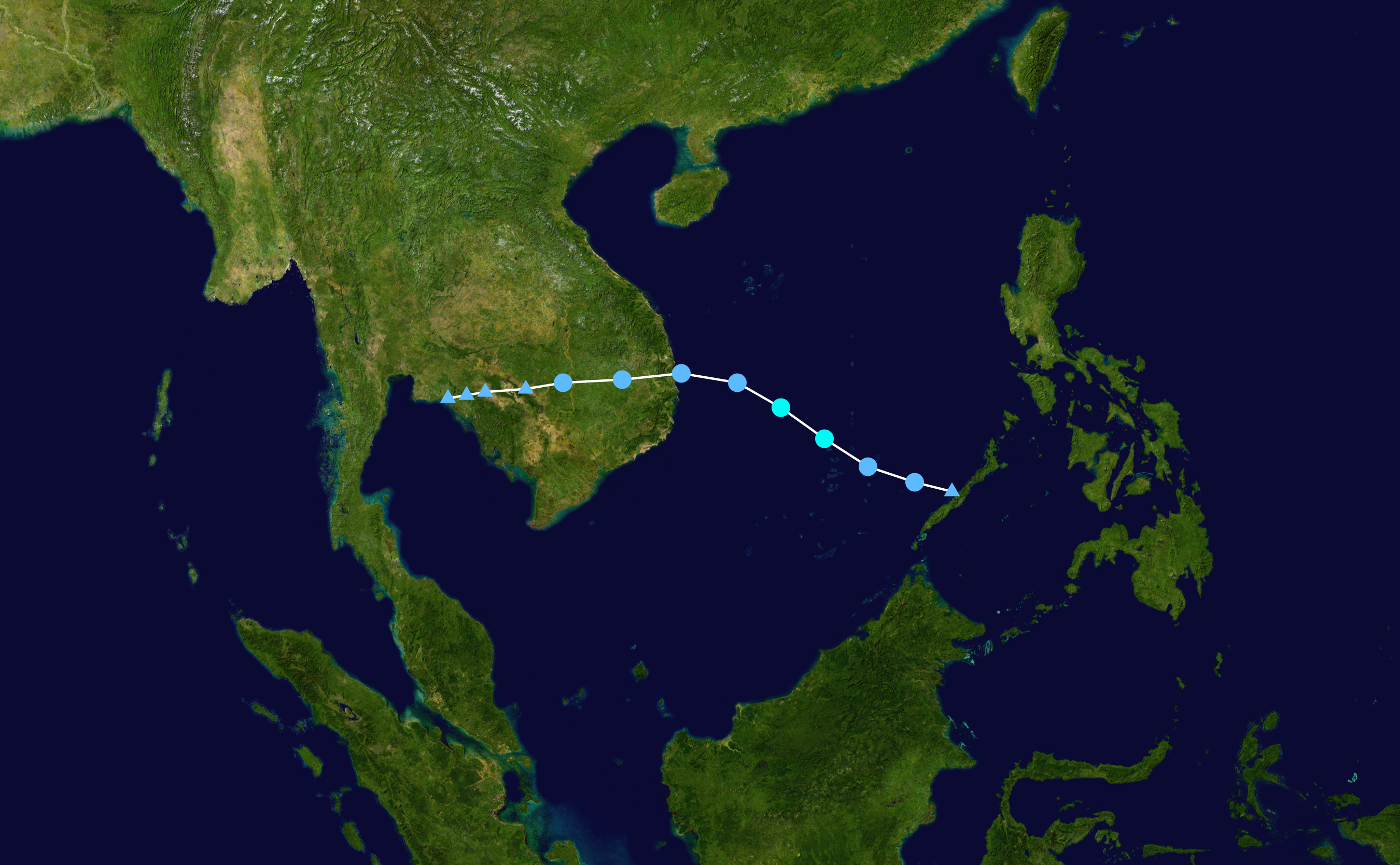
- Duration: October 14 – October 15
- Peak intensity: 75 km/h (45 mph) (1-min); 995 hPa (mbar)

Shirley tracked through Vietnam. Shirley weakened to a tropical depression before hitting Vietnam.

=== Typhoon Trix ===
- Typhoon (JMA)
- Category 4 typhoon (SSHWS)
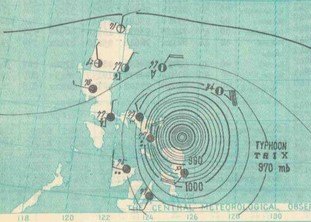
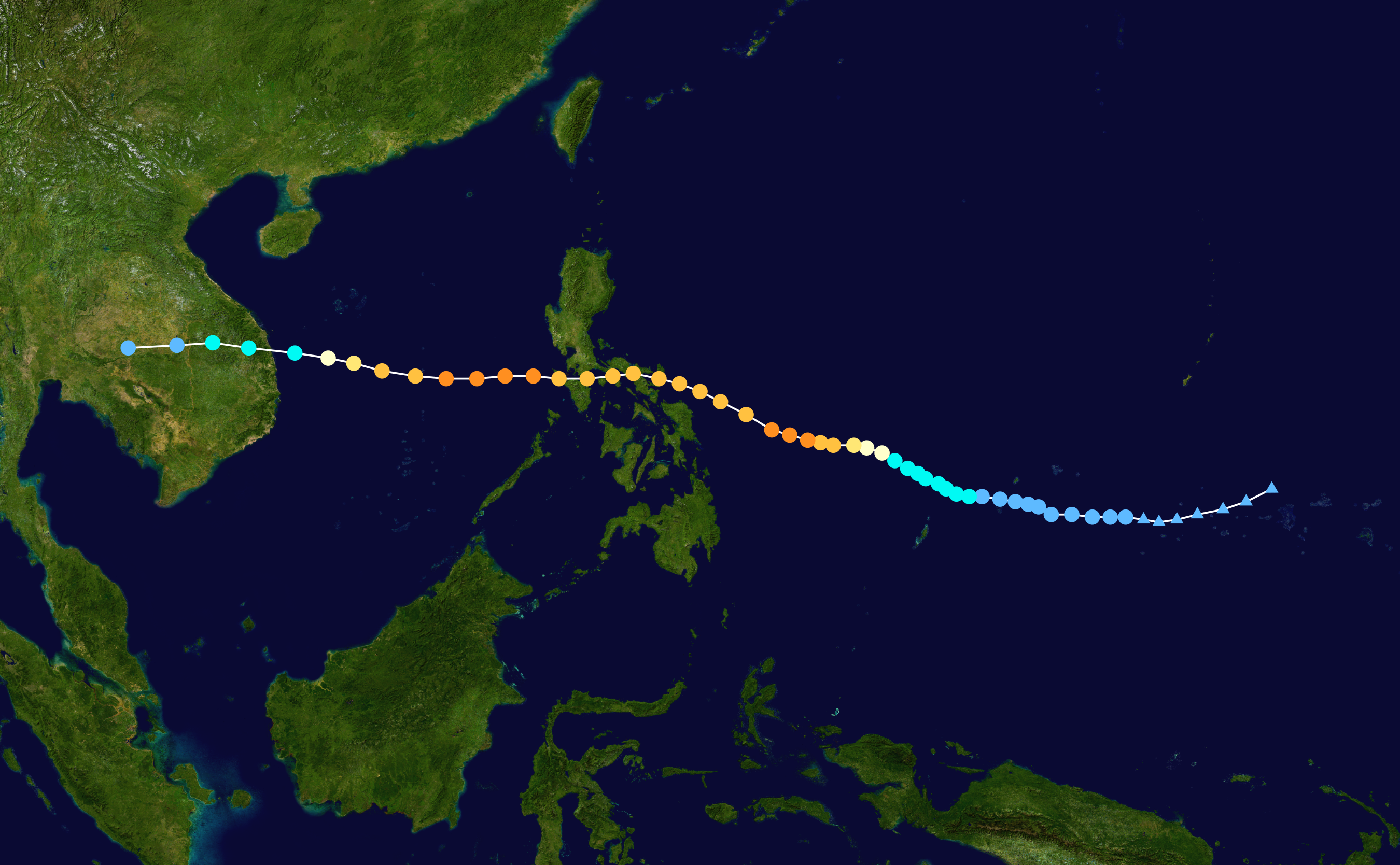
- Duration: October 15 – October 26
- Peak intensity: 220 km/h (140 mph) (1-min); 965 hPa (mbar)

Typhoon Trix formed near Micronesia on October 15, 1952, tracking southwest. It intensified rapidly, becoming a tropical storm on October 16 and a typhoon shortly after. Trix reached peak intensity as a Category 4 super typhoon with winds of 220 km/h (135 mph) and a central pressure of 965 hPa on October 20, while approaching the Philippines. Weakening slightly, Trix made landfall in the Bicol Region on October 21, traversing the central Philippines. It emerged into the South China Sea, briefly re-intensifying to Category 4 strength before weakening again. Trix made final landfall near Quảng Ngãi, Vietnam, as a tropical storm on October 25. The JMA ceased advisories inland, while the JTWC tracked its remnants into Thailand.

Trix caused catastrophic damage, killing over 1,400 people (995 in the Philippines, at least 405 in Indochina). In the Philippines, it devastated southern Luzon (especially Legazpi and Tabaco), Samar, Leyte, and the Bicol region. Winds reached 215 km/h, leveling tens of thousands of homes (30% damaged overall), destroying crops (including half of Leyte's rice), and causing widespread flooding. Damage was estimated at $60 million, leaving 500,000 homeless. Recovery efforts were hampered by communication failures and soggy airfields. In Vietnam, a tornado near Ho Chi Minh City killed 10, and a French aircraft crashed. It was called the "worst typhoon within living memory" in the Philippines.

=== Typhoon Vae ===
- Typhoon (JMA)
- Category 1 typhoon (SSHWS)
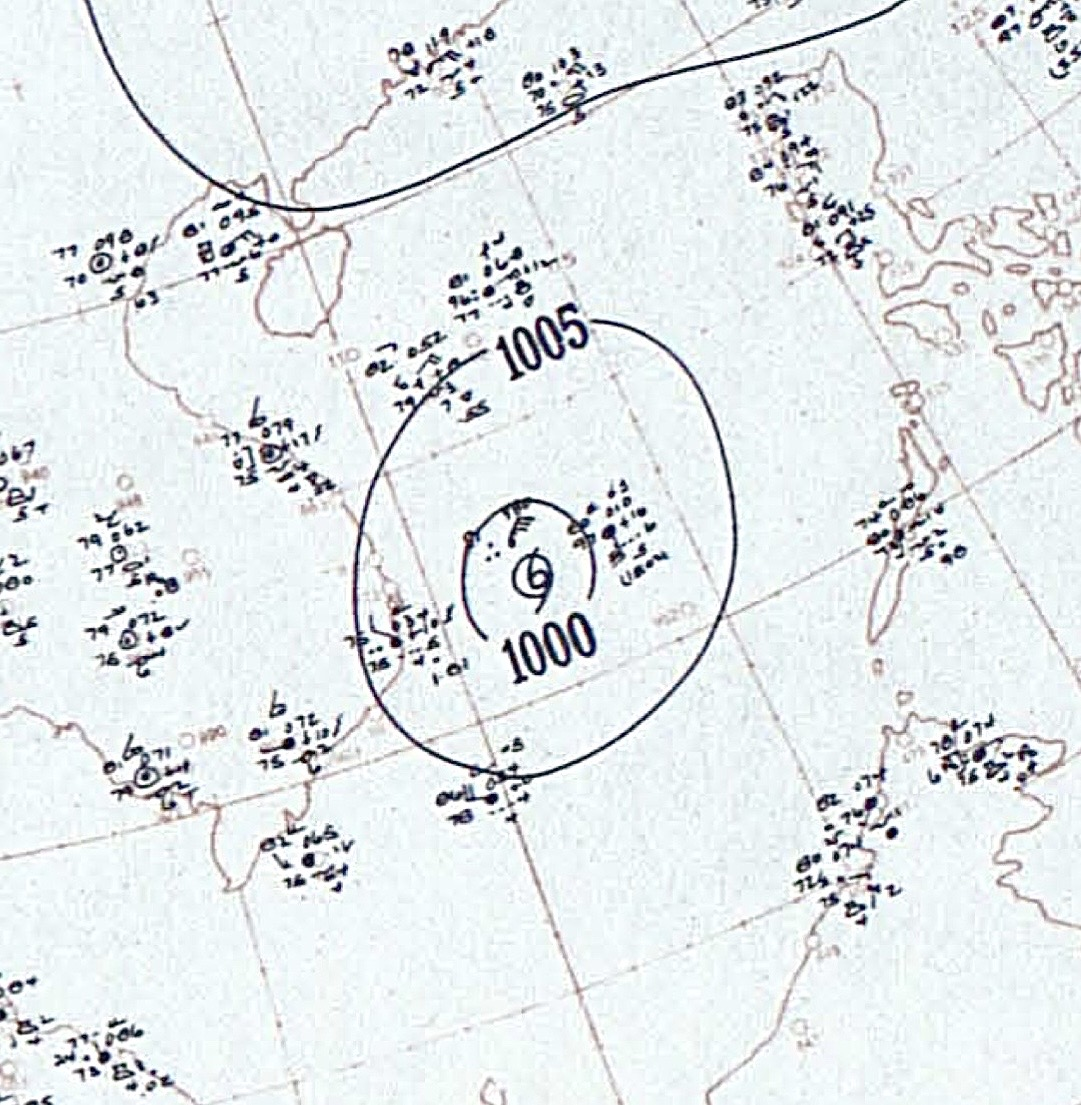
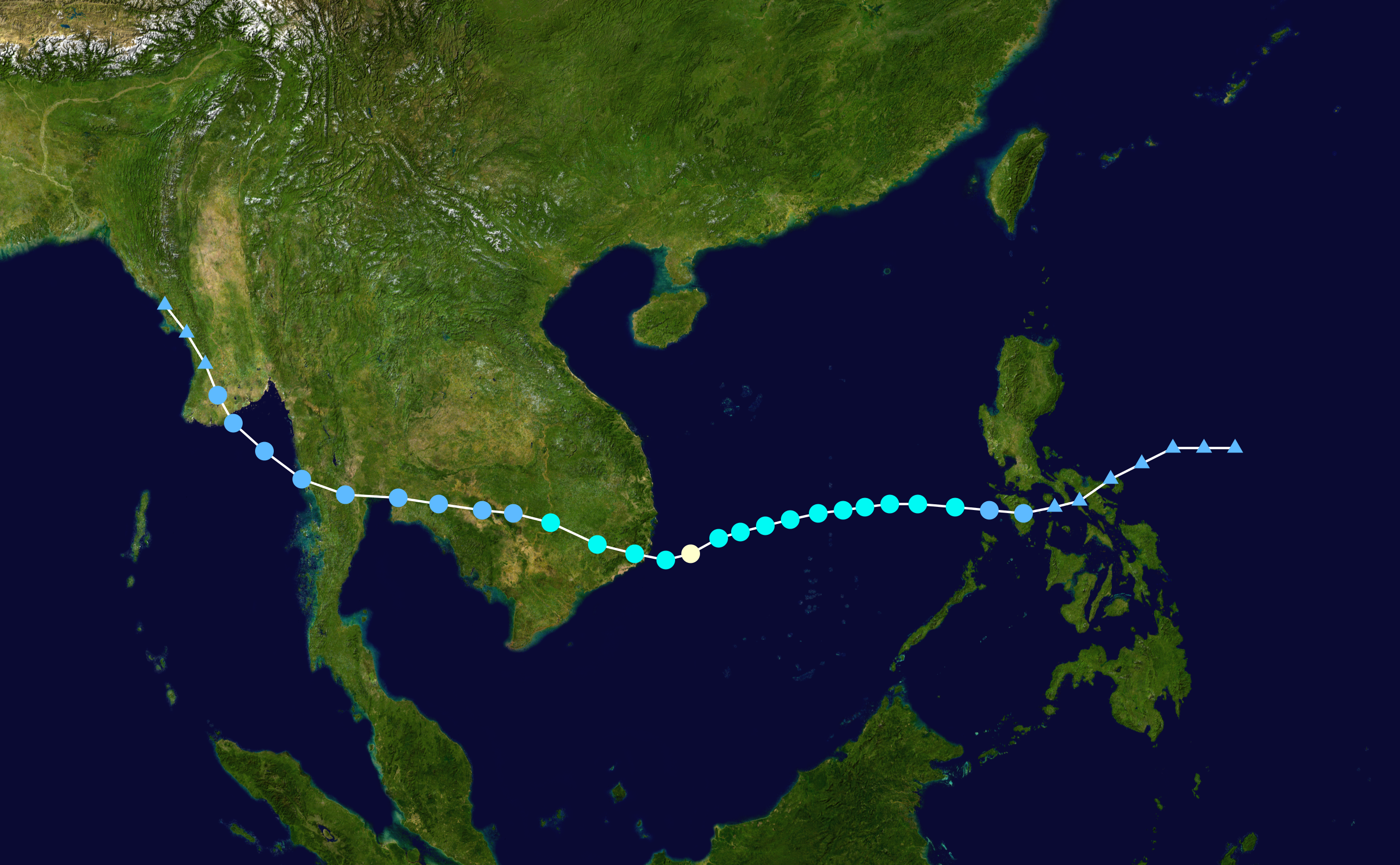
- Duration: October 17 – October 20
- Peak intensity: 120 km/h (75 mph) (1-min); 974 hPa (mbar)

Typhoon Vae originated as a low-pressure area in the western Philippine Sea on October 15. Initially classified as a tropical disturbance, it tracked steadily westward over the next two days, intensifying into a tropical depression by October 17 near the Philippines. Vae reached tropical storm status later that day and intensified into a Category 1 typhoon by October 20, with peak sustained winds of 75 mph (120 km/h) and a minimum central pressure of 975 hPa. The storm maintained this strength while approaching the Vietnamese coast. On October 20, Vae made landfall in southern Vietnam as a tropical storm. After landfall, Vae rapidly weakened and degenerated into a tropical depression by October 21. The remnant system continued westward across Cambodia and Thailand, emerging into the North Indian Ocean near the Andaman Sea before fully dissipating on October 24.

=== Super Typhoon Wilma ===
- Typhoon (JMA)
- Category 5 super typhoon (SSHWS)
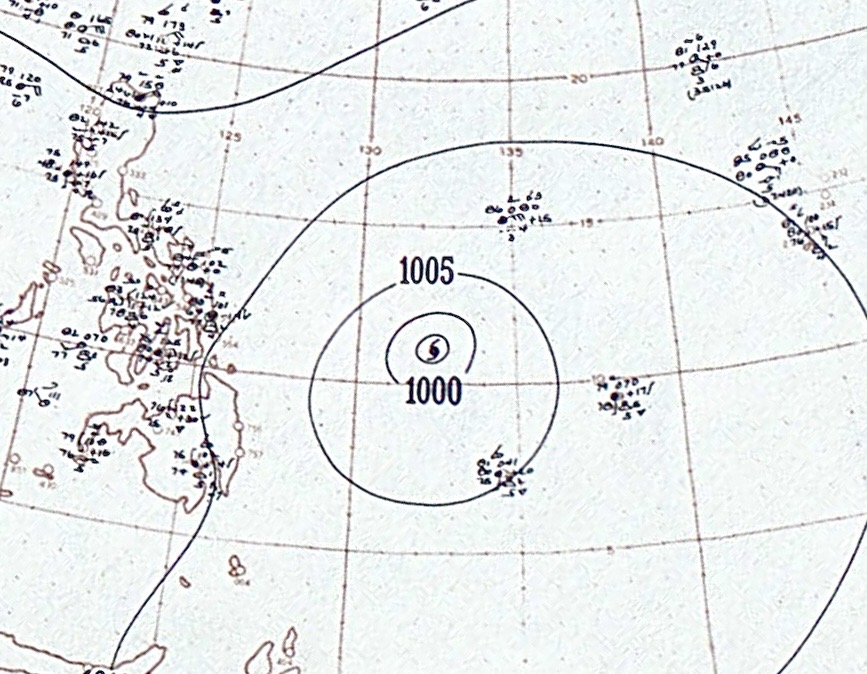
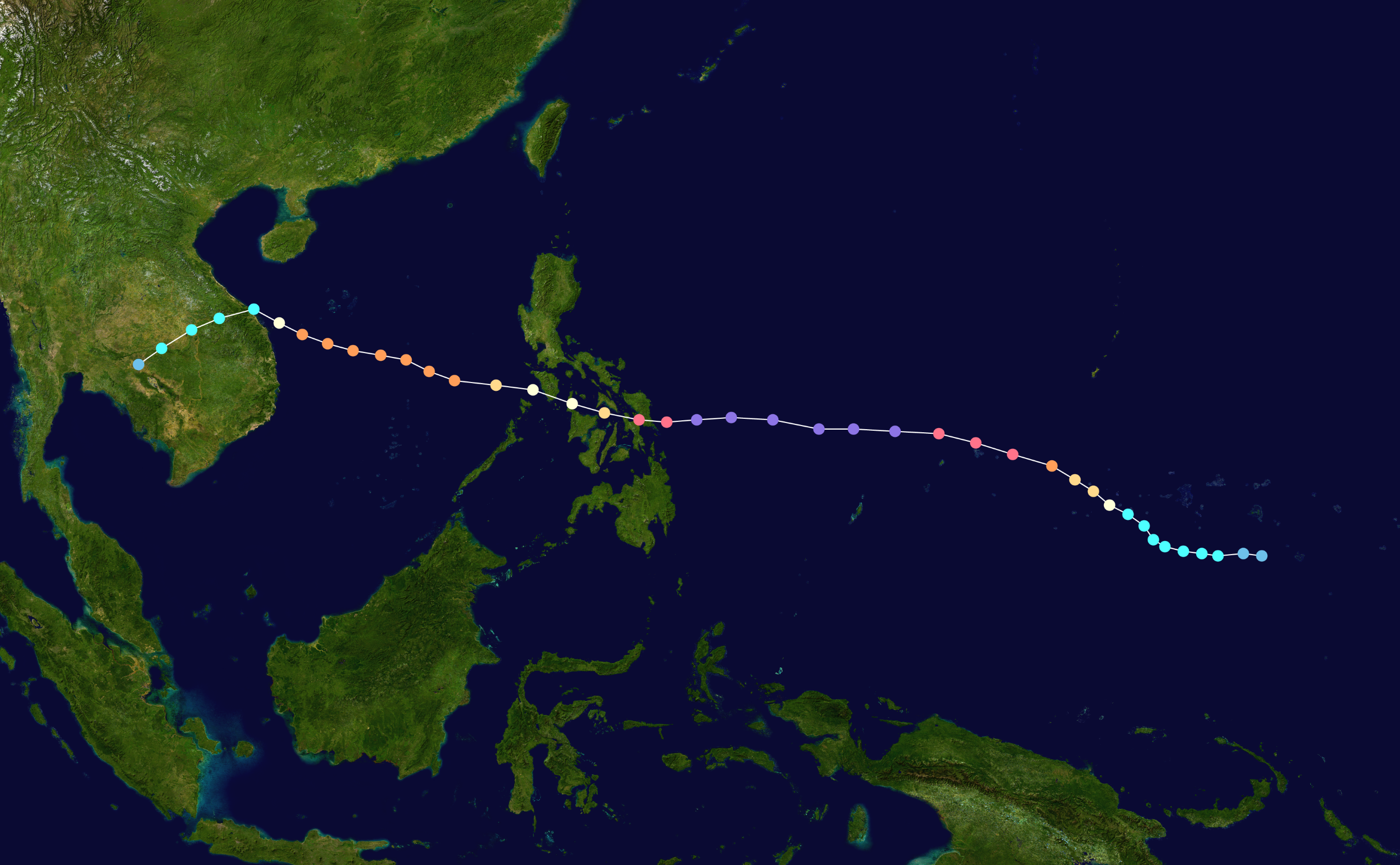
- Duration: October 21 – October 31
- Peak intensity: 295 km/h (185 mph) (1-min); 893 hPa (mbar)

Typhoon Wilma was a powerful typhoon, reaching Category 5 status on the Saffir-Simpson Hurricane Wind Scale (SSHWS). The storm formed on October 21. Over the next few days, it moved west and reached peak intensity before making landfall in the Philippines. The storm moved into the South China Sea and made landfall in Vietnam as a tropical storm, and dissipated on October 31.

=== Super Typhoon Agnes ===
- Typhoon (JMA)
- Category 5 super typhoon (SSHWS)
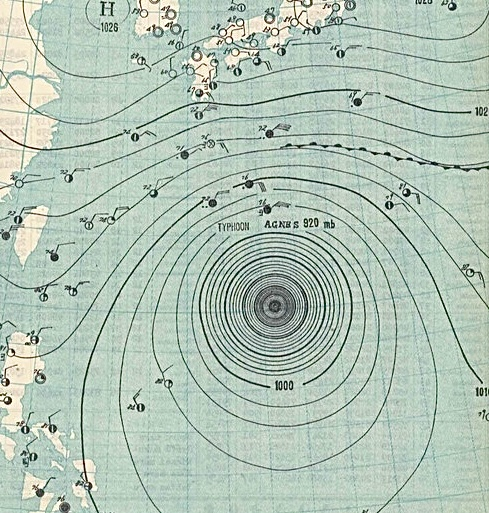
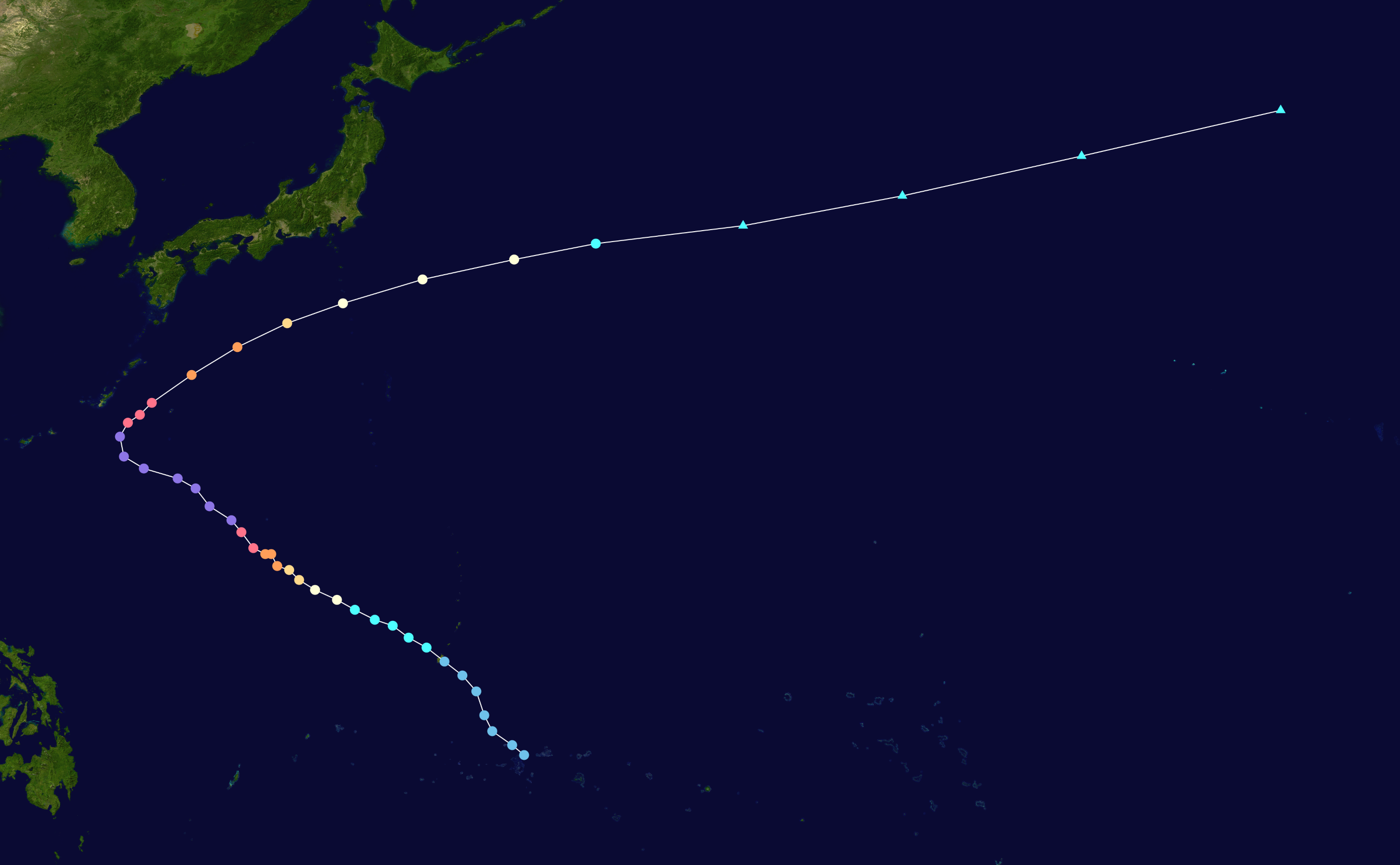
- Duration: October 28 – November 7
- Peak intensity: 280 km/h (175 mph) (1-min); 920 hPa (mbar)

Typhoon Agnes was a strong Category 5 that stayed out to sea without causing much impact to land.

=== Typhoon Bess ===
- Typhoon (JMA)
- Category 3 typhoon (SSHWS)
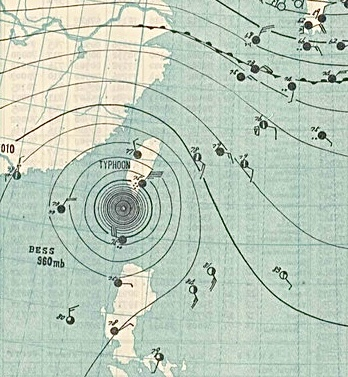
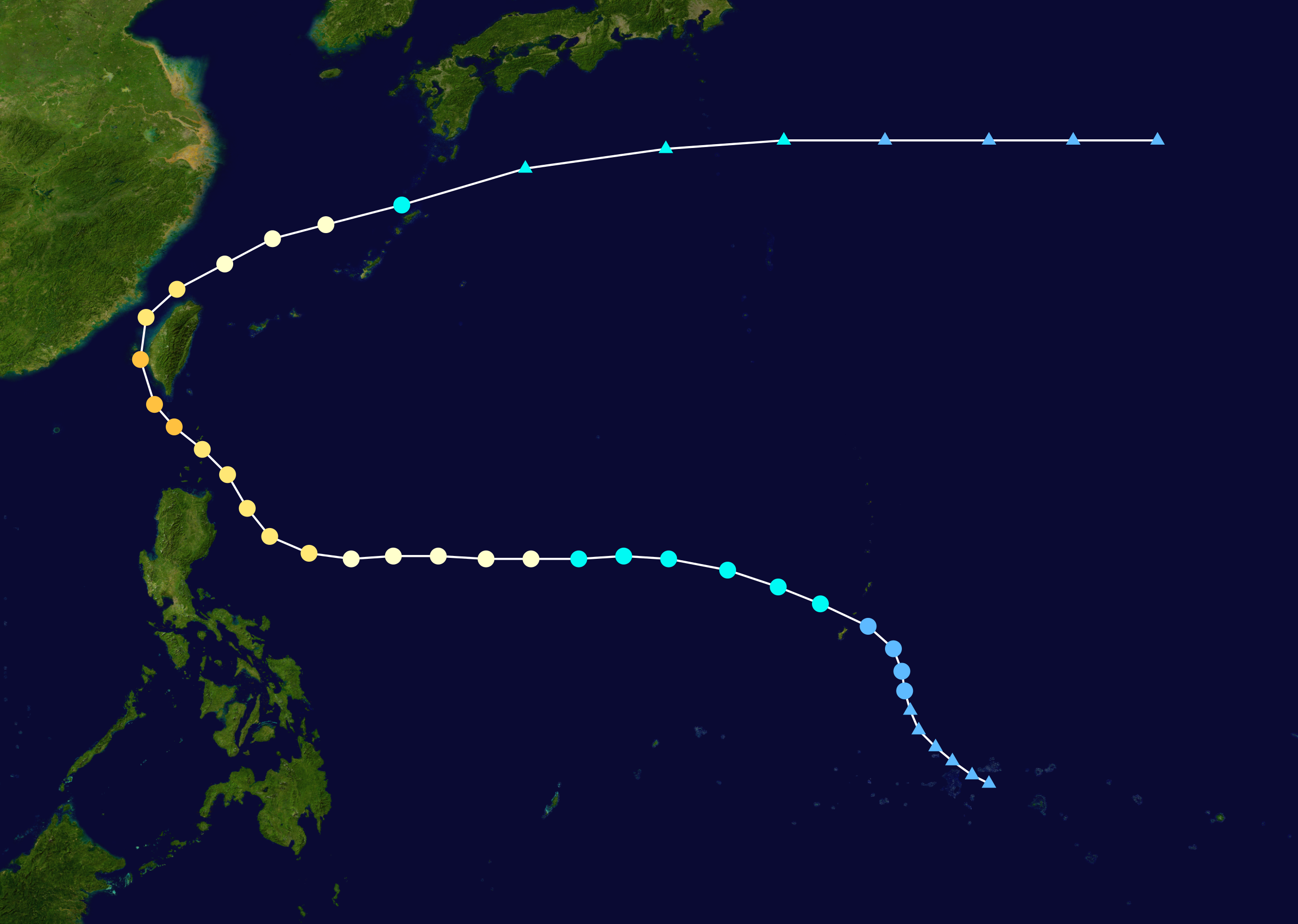
- Duration: November 9 – November 16
- Peak intensity: 185 km/h (115 mph) (1-min); 915 hPa (mbar)

Bess affected China as a Category 3 typhoon.

=== Typhoon Carmen ===
- Typhoon (JMA)
- Category 3 typhoon (SSHWS)
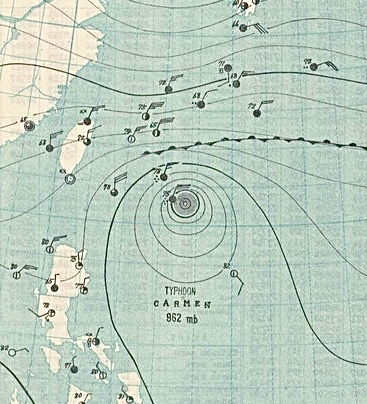
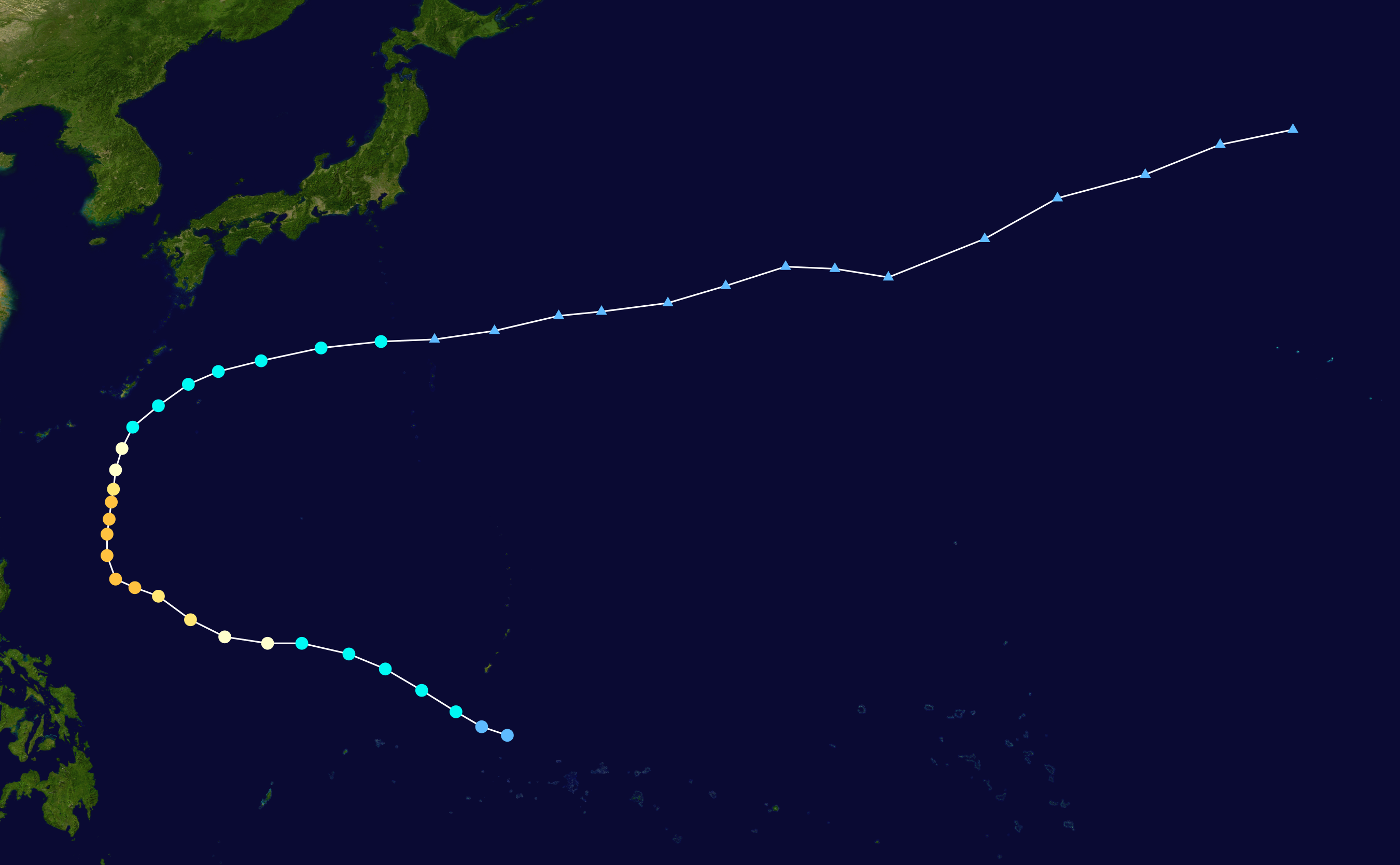
- Duration: November 15 – November 22
- Peak intensity: 205 km/h (125 mph) (1-min); 950 hPa (mbar)

Carmen was a Category 3 typhoon that didn't make landfall.

=== Super Typhoon Della ===
- Typhoon (JMA)
- Category 5 super typhoon (SSHWS)
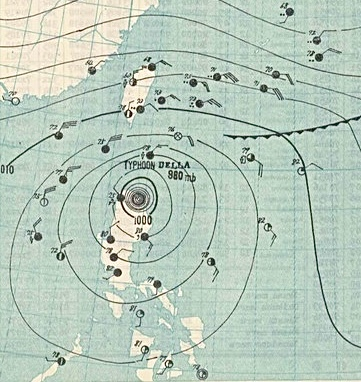
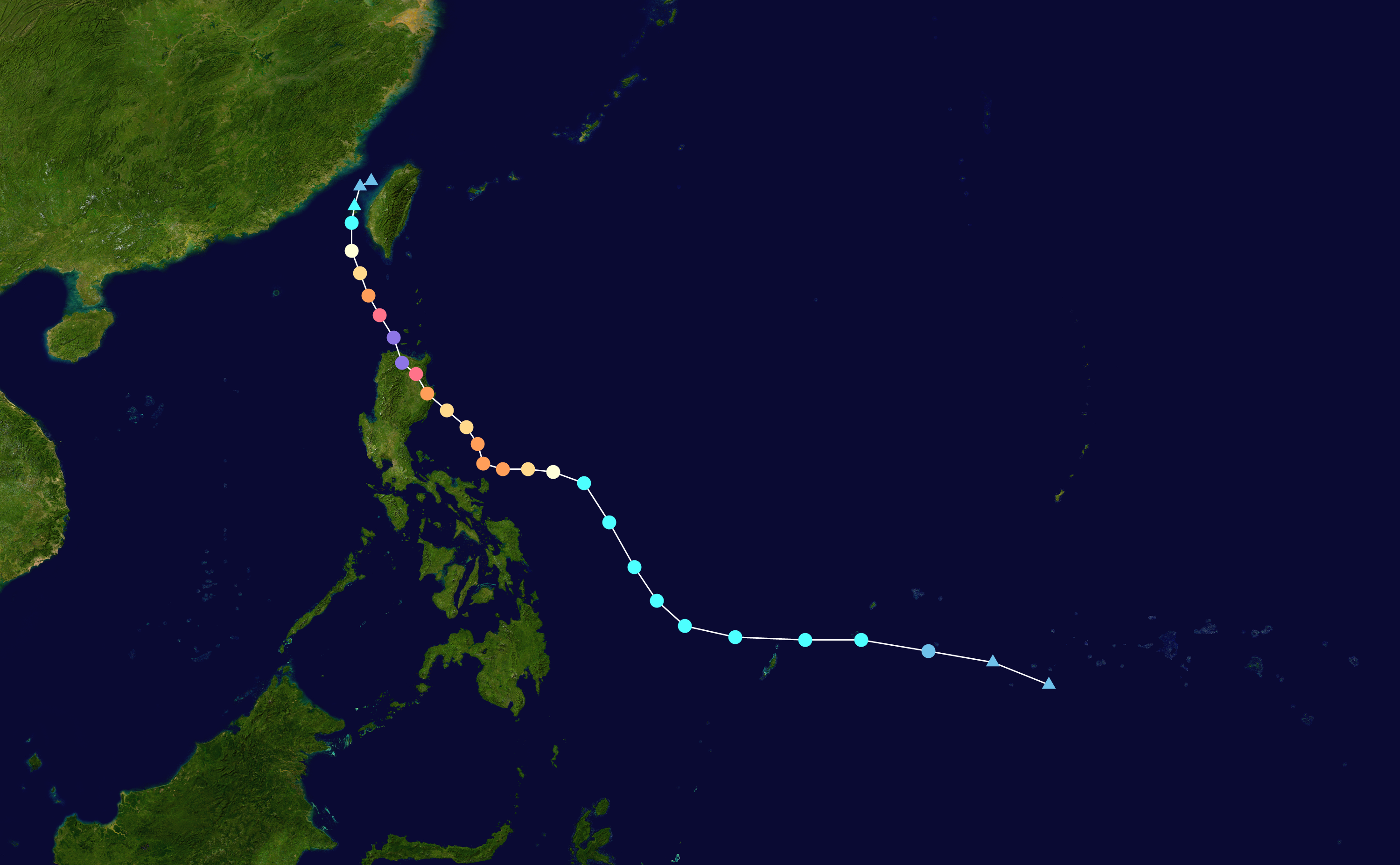
- Duration: November 22 – November 27
- Peak intensity: 280 km/h (175 mph) (1-min); 930 hPa (mbar)

Della impacted the Philippines as a Category 5 super typhoon.

=== Tropical Storm Elaine ===
- Typhoon (JMA)
- Tropical storm (SSHWS)
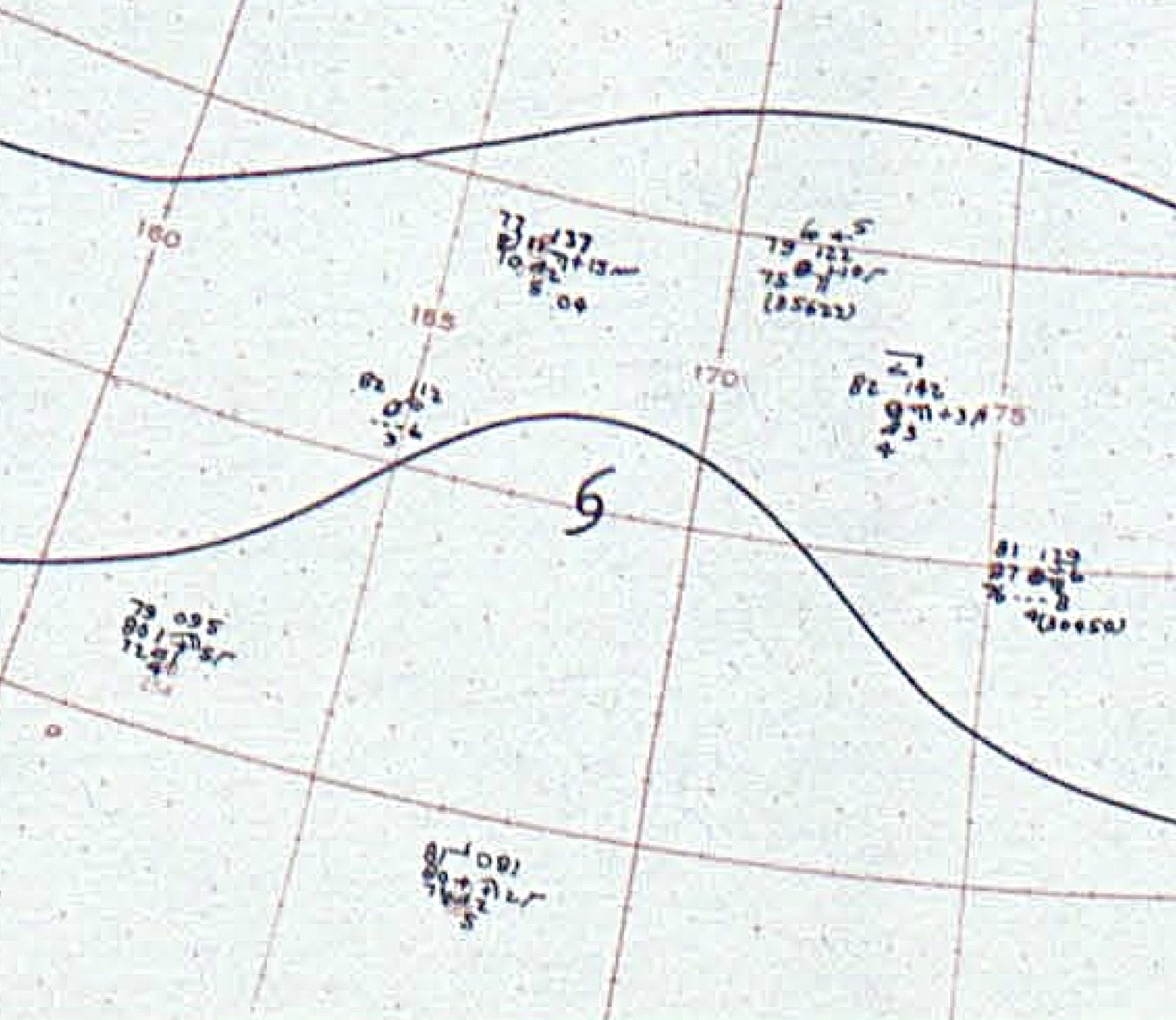
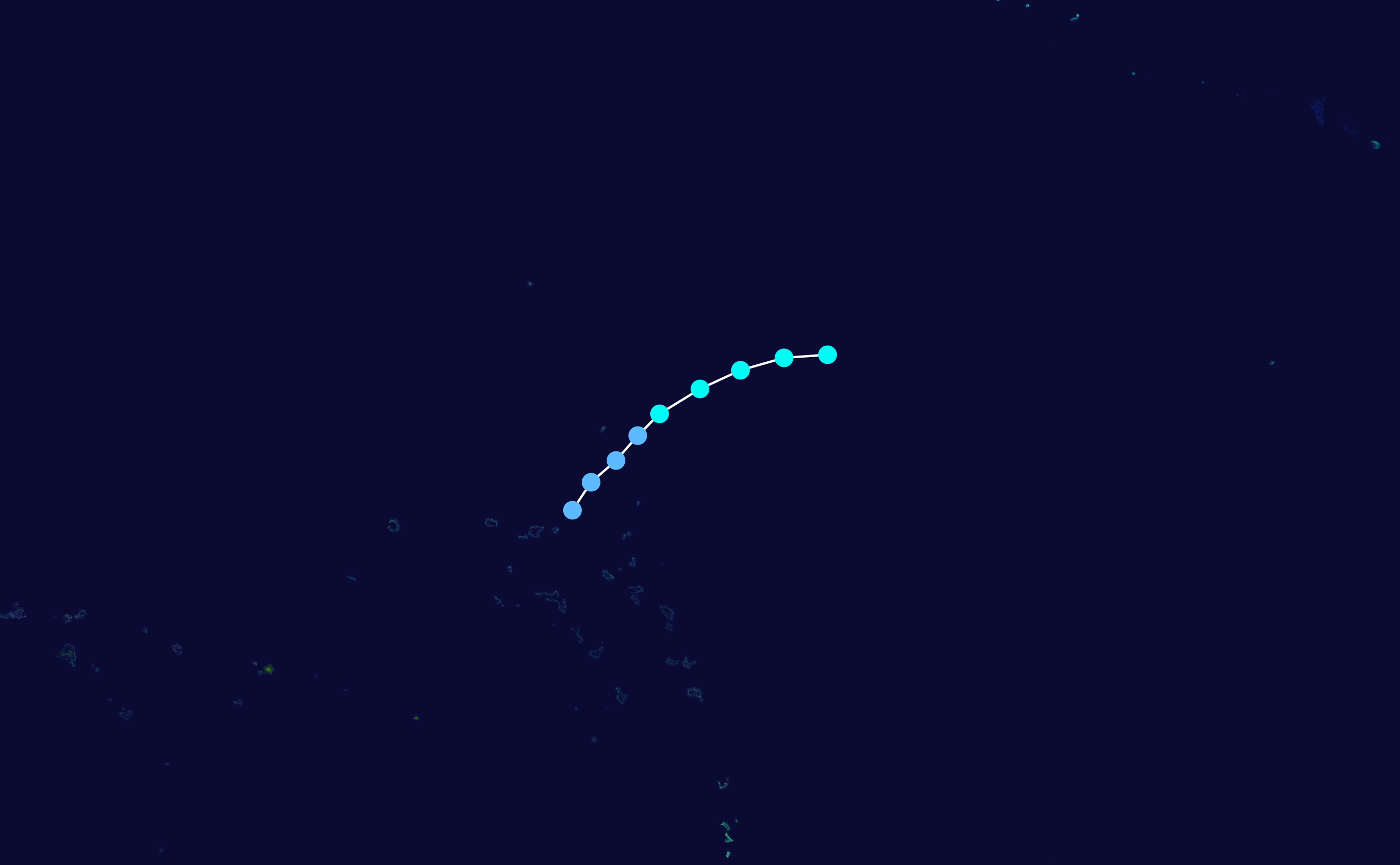
- Duration: December 4 – December 6
- Peak intensity: 85 km/h (50 mph) (1-min); 990 hPa (mbar)

Elaine was a weak tropical storm that stayed in the sea.

=== Tropical Storm Faye ===
- Typhoon (JMA)
- Tropical storm (SSHWS)
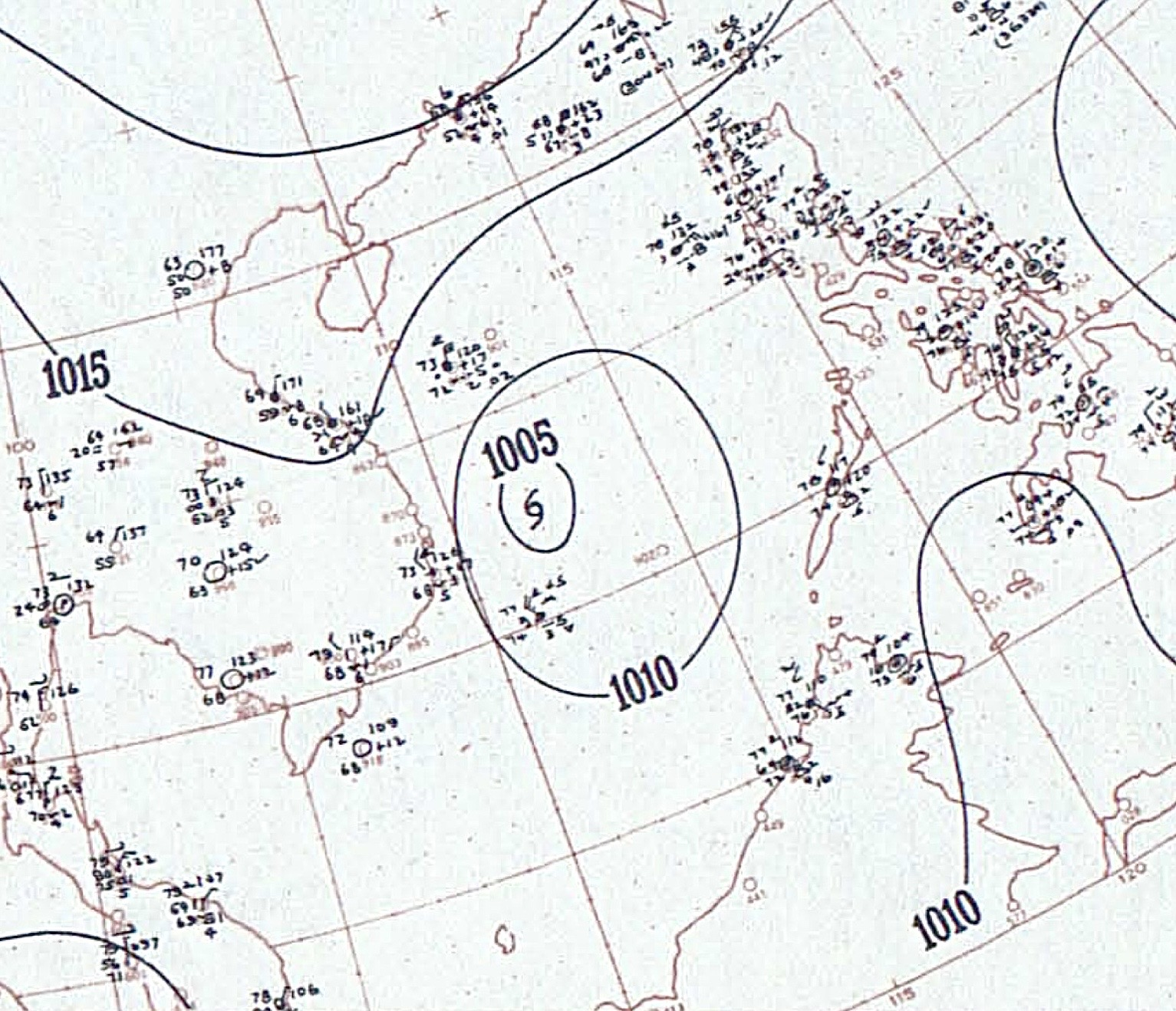
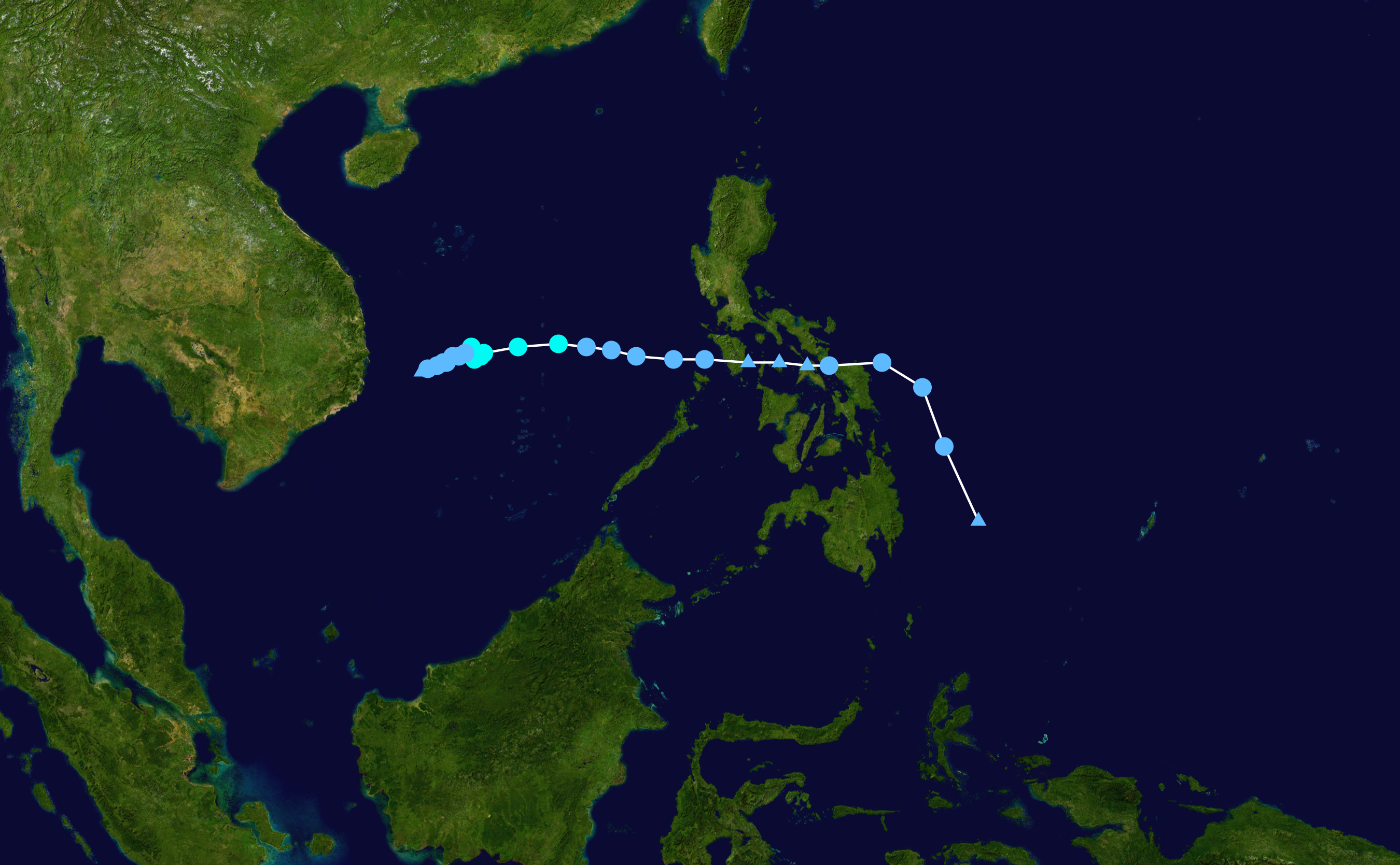
- Duration: December 16 – December 19
- Peak intensity: 85 km/h (50 mph) (1-min); 990 hPa (mbar)

Faye hit the Philippines as a tropical depression. It intensified into a tropical storm in the South China Sea before dissipating.

=== Super Typhoon Gloria ===
- Typhoon (JMA)
- Category 4 super typhoon (SSHWS)
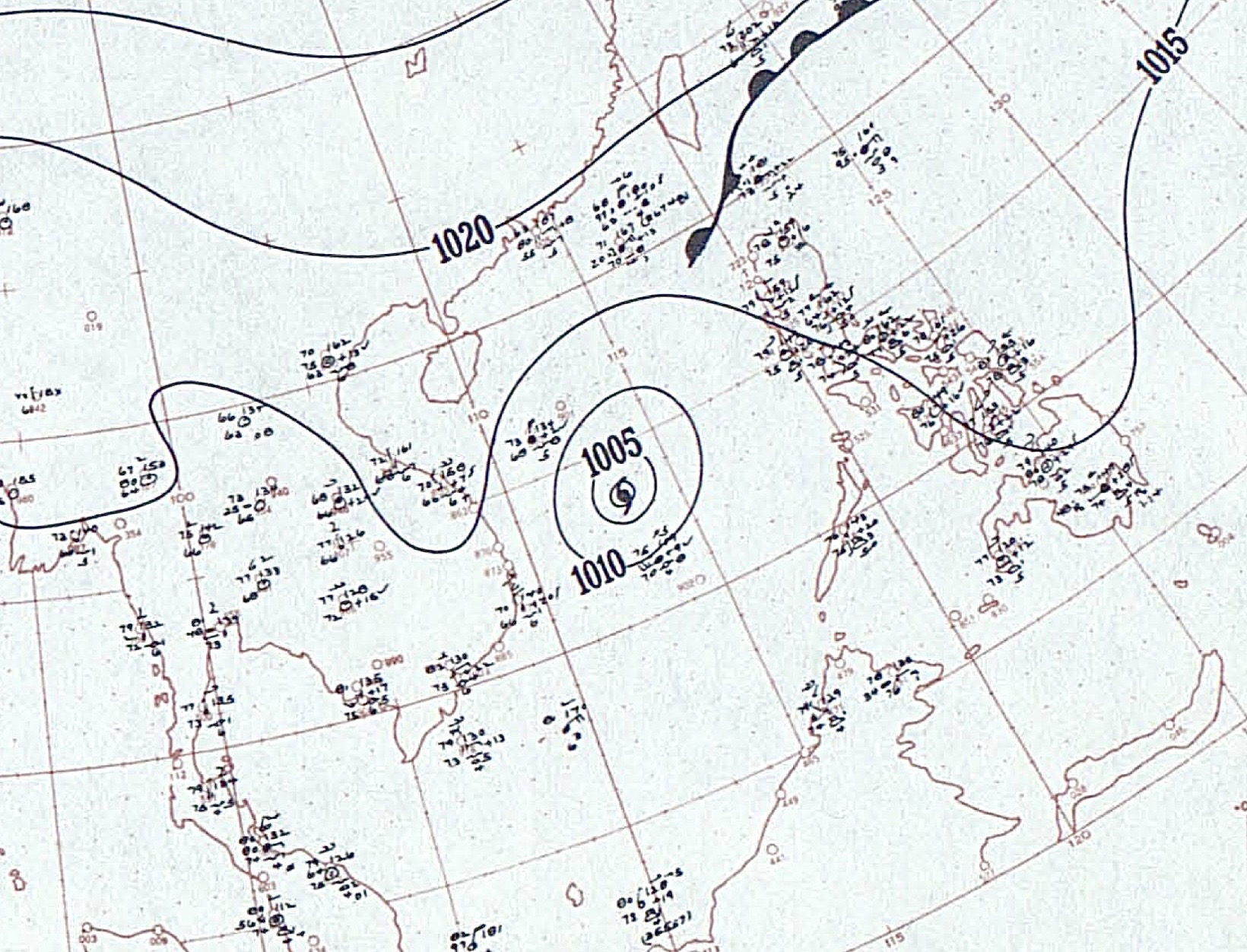
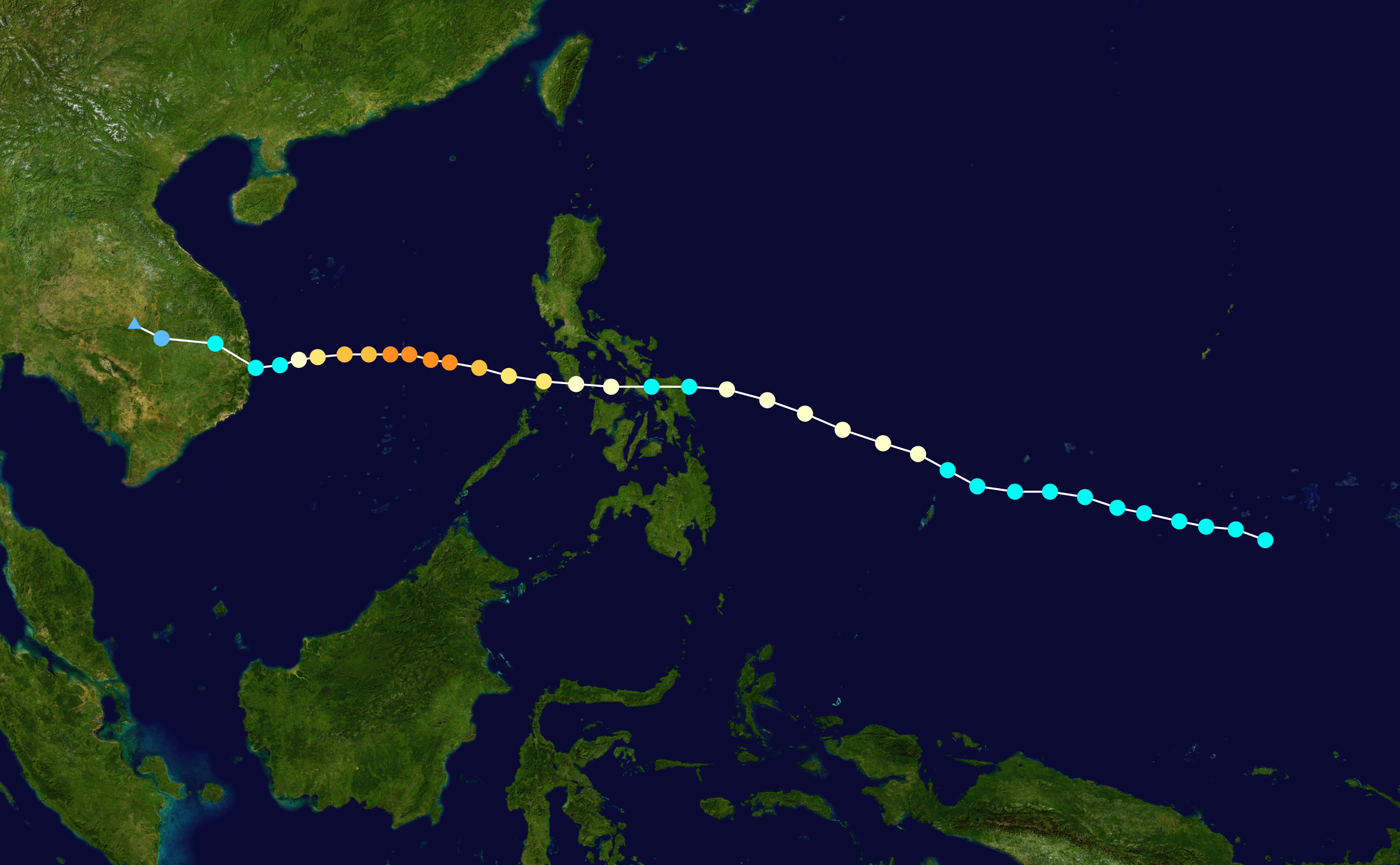
- Duration: December 16 – December 25
- Peak intensity: 240 km/h (150 mph) (1-min); 990 hPa (mbar)

Gloria formed southeast of Guam on December 16. It drifted west, slowly intensifying. The storm hit Philippines as a tropical storm. As Gloria entered the South China Sea, it rapidly intensified into a category 4 super typhoon with winds of 240 km/h. It hit Vietnam and dissipated on December 25.

=== Super Typhoon Hester ===
- Typhoon (JMA)
- Category 5 super typhoon (SSHWS)
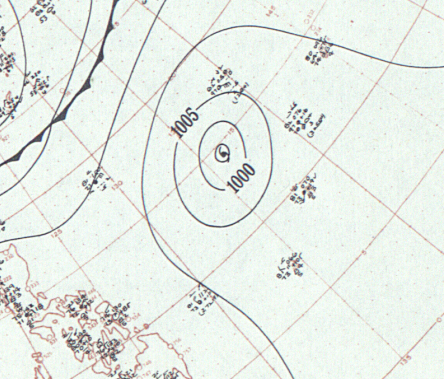
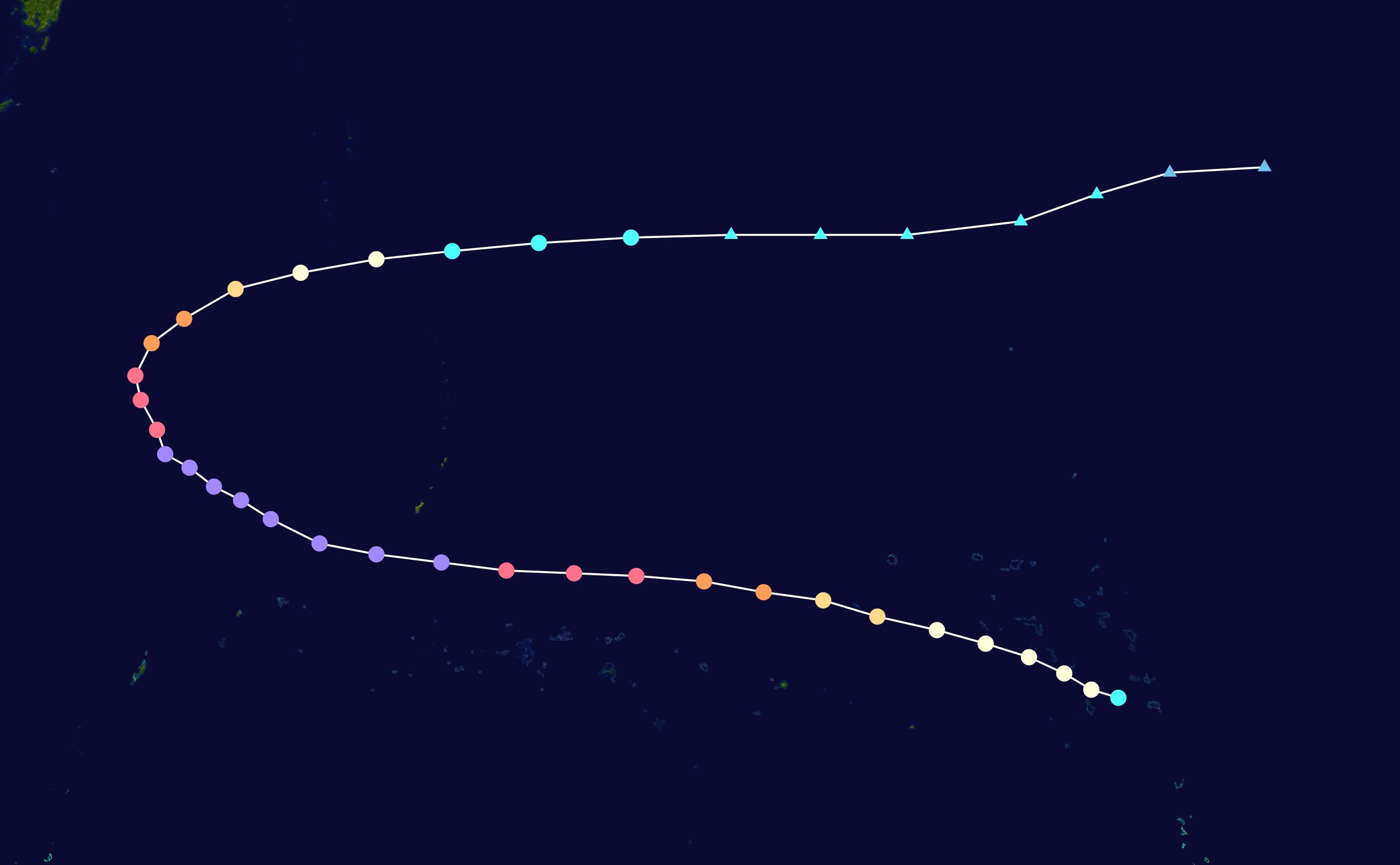
- Duration: December 27 – January 4
- Peak intensity: 295 km/h (185 mph) (1-min); 905 hPa (mbar)

Hester was first observed on December 27, south of Ebeye, which intensified into a typhoon by the next day. The storm began to rapidly intensify, as it moved a short distance north of the Caroline Islands. At 0000 UTC of December 30, Hester became a Category 5 typhoon on the Saffir–Simpson hurricane wind scale. On the next day, it attained winds of 185 mph (295 km/h) as it began to turn northwest. On New Year's Day, the JMA recorded Hester's lowest pressure of 905 hPa (26.7 inHg). Hester began to weaken later that day, and soon recurved to the northeast. Hester fell to tropical storm status by January 4, and became extratropical a day later. At 0600 UTC of January 6, JMA stopped tracking the cyclone northeast of Wake Island.

The northwest quadrant of Hester passed over Enewetak. The United States Navy estimated that Hester generated winds around 70 mph (110 km/h), and generated waves up to 30 feet (9.1 m) high on Enewetak. The island was mostly underwater when the storm passed it. The hospital, mess halls, and clubs were damaged by the winds. Tents on the island were also destroyed. A Coast Guard LORAN station on the island suffered extensive damage. Overall, eighteen people were injured on Enewetak. The nearby atoll of Ujelang, received stronger winds than Enewetak, as it was closer to the center of Hester. In Guam, underground shelters were open to residents, and hospitals were evacuated by December 31. All government offices and businesses were closed on the island. Roadblocks were placed by the police to keep vehicles off the road. A gale alert was issued for the Mariana Islands. On Guam, storm surge reached 200 feet (61 m) inland, to about 10 feet (3.0 m) above sea level. The only damage reported were crops being lashed by the waves on the south side of the island, and a new section of highway near Ylig River was washed away. Two shore wave recorders installed by the University of California, Berkeley, located in Tarague Beach and Ylig River, were destroyed.

== Storm names ==
- Charlotte
- Dinah
- Emma
- Freda
- Gilda
- Harriet
- Ivy
- Jeanne
- Karen
- Lois
- Mary
- Nona
- Olive
- Polly
- Rose
- Shirley
- Trix
- Vae
- Wilma
- Agnes
- Bess
- Carmen
- Della
- Elaine
- Faye
- Gloria
- Hester

== See also ==
- 1952 Pacific hurricane season
- 1952 Atlantic hurricane season
- 1952 North Indian Ocean cyclone season
- Australian region cyclone seasons: 1951–52 1952–53
- South Pacific cyclone seasons: 1951–52 1952–53
- South-West Indian Ocean cyclone seasons: 1951–52 1952–53
