= 1950 North Indian Ocean cyclone season =

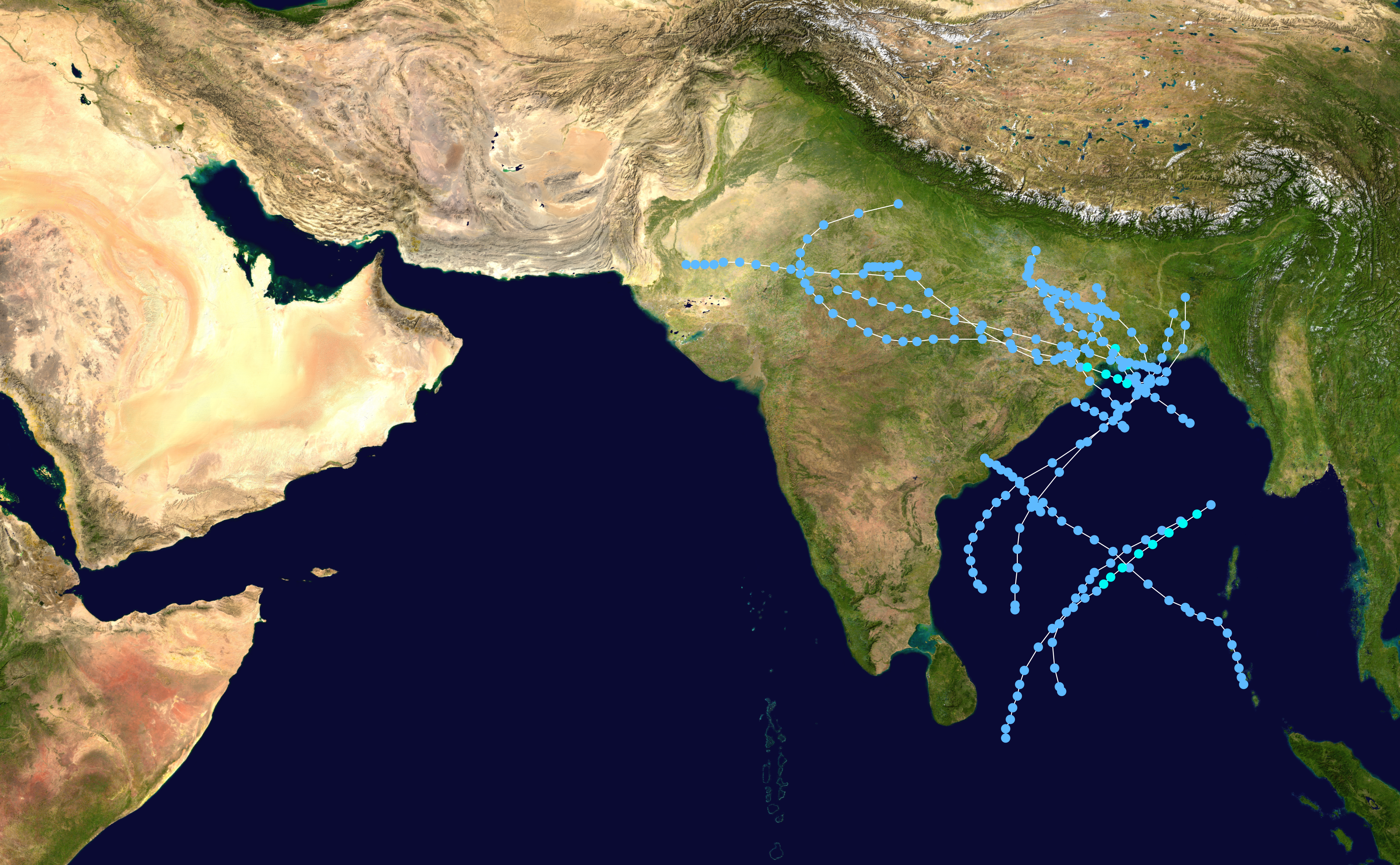
- Season summary map

Seasonal boundaries
- First system formed: April 8, 1950
- Last system dissipated: December 6, 1950

Seasonal statistics
- Depressions: 16
- Deep depressions: 9
- Cyclonic storms: 4
- Total fatalities: Unknown
- Total damage: Unknown

Related articles
- 1950 Atlantic hurricane season; 1950 Pacific hurricane season; 1950 Pacific typhoon season

The 1950 North Indian Ocean cyclone season was part of the annual cycle of tropical cyclone formation. The season has no official bounds but cyclones tend to form between April and December. These dates conventionally delimit the period of each year when most tropical cyclones form in the northern Indian Ocean. There are two main seas in the North Indian Ocean—the Bay of Bengal to the east of the Indian subcontinent and the Arabian Sea to the west of India. The official Regional Specialized Meteorological Centre in this basin is the India Meteorological Department (IMD), while the Joint Typhoon Warning Center (JTWC) releases unofficial advisories. An average of five tropical cyclones form in the North Indian Ocean every season with peaks in May and November. Cyclones occurring between the meridians 45°E and 100°E are included in the season by the IMD.

Sixteen depressions developed during the 1950 season, with four of them becoming cyclonic storms while three of them formed over the land. Most tropical cyclones formed in this season are weak, as there is no severe cyclonic storms formed during this season.

== Systems ==
=== Deep Depression One ===
- Deep depression (IMD)
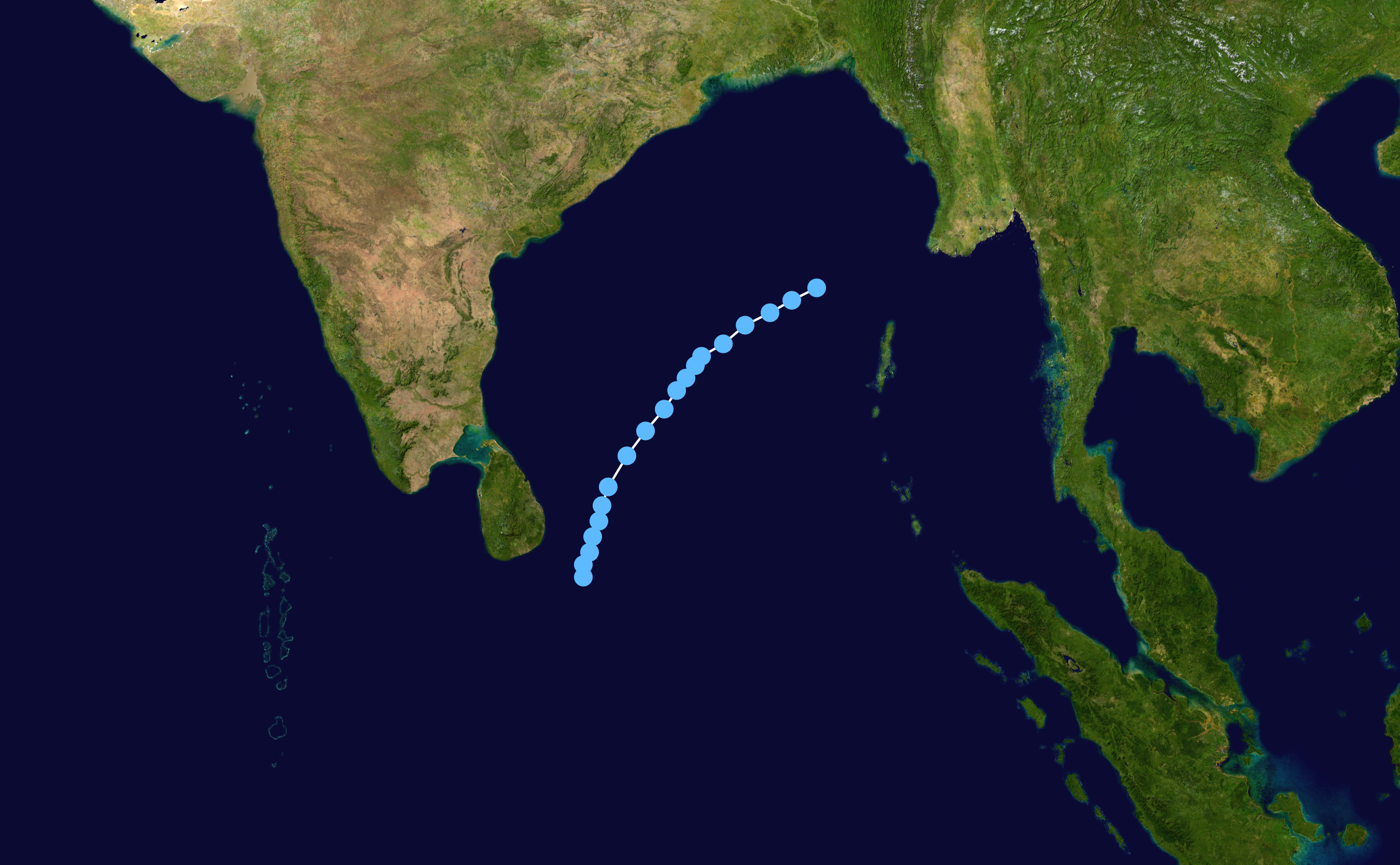
- Duration: April 8 – April 13
- Peak intensity: Winds not specified;

A ship reported thunderstorm rains in the southeast of Sri Lanka in April 4 while a shallow low was formed in the southeast Bay of Bengal on the next day, when Car Nicobar experienced overcast conditions and northeasterly winds. The low moved west and a well-marked trough formed southeast of Sri Lanka in the morning of April 7. By April 8, the trough developed into depression as winds of 15 to 20 knots are reported by number of vessels, and a vessel reported southerly winds The depression tracked north and then tracking northeast by April 10. By April 11, the system intensified and begins to accelerate towards Burma on evening of the same day. In April 13, the system moved ashore across southern Rakhine State coasts and quickly dissipated over land.

The system dropped heavy rains on the east coast of Sri Lanka on April 8 and April 9. As the depression moved northeastwards, widespread rains occurred over Napier Bay Islands on April 11 and April 13, killing two people in Port Blair. As system made landfall near Burmese coast, heavy rains caused some damage to the property and five people.

=== Deep Depression Two ===
- Deep depression (IMD)
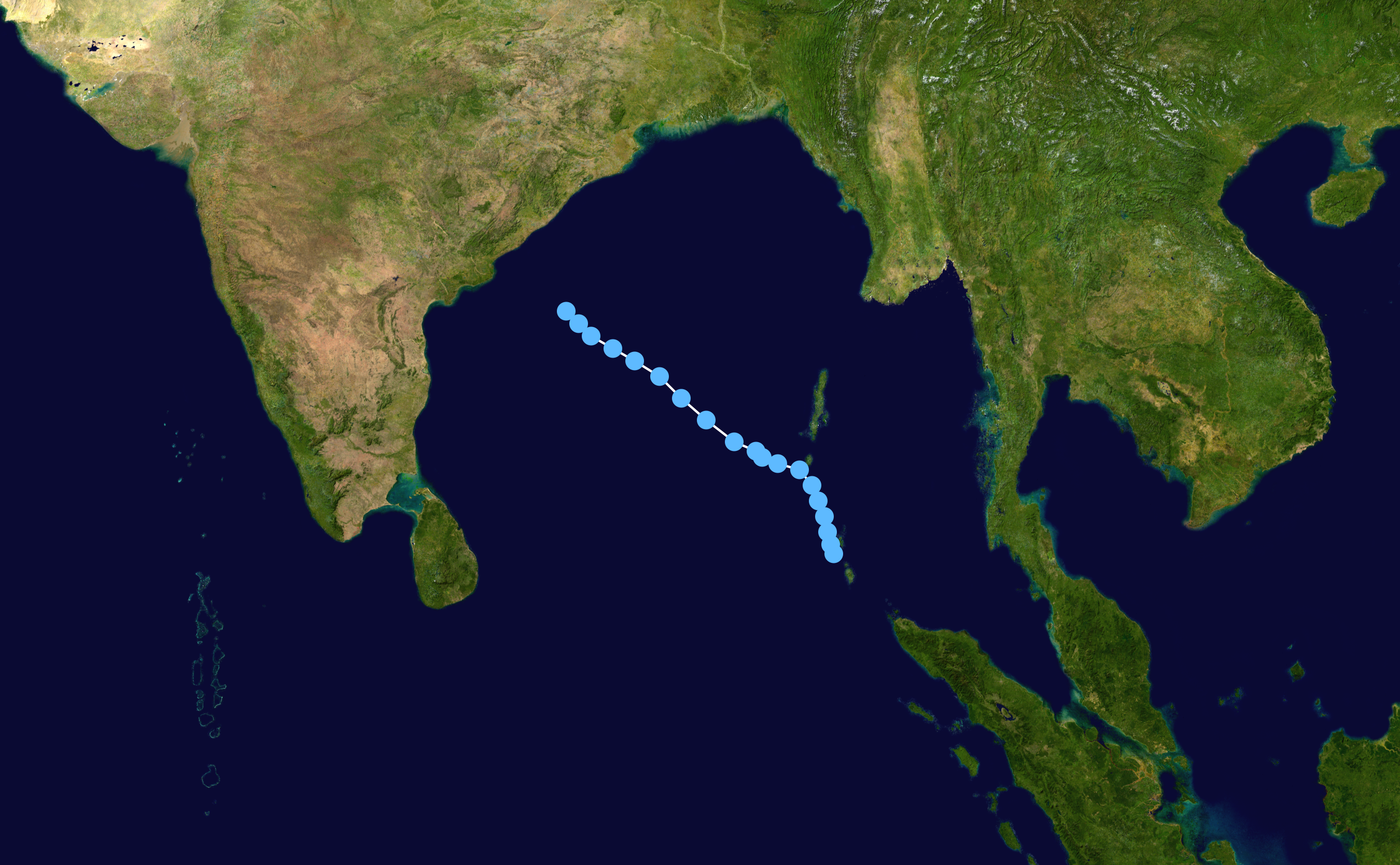
- Duration: May 23 – May 30
- Peak intensity: Winds not specified; 998 hPa (mbar)

=== Cyclonic Storm Three ===
- Cyclonic storm (IMD)
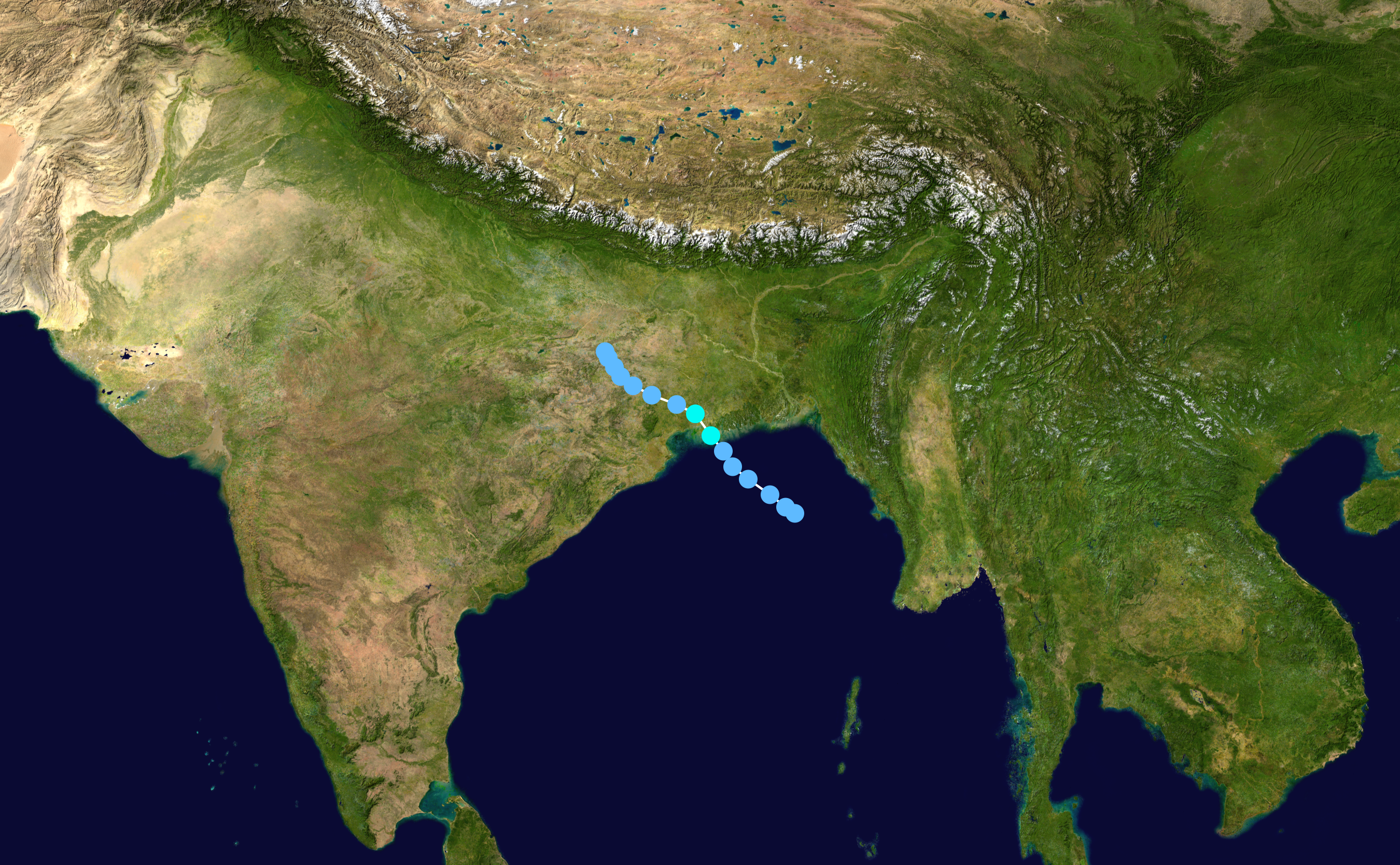
- Duration: June 8 – June 12
- Peak intensity: 85 km/h (50 mph) (3-min);

=== Depression Four ===
- Depression (IMD)
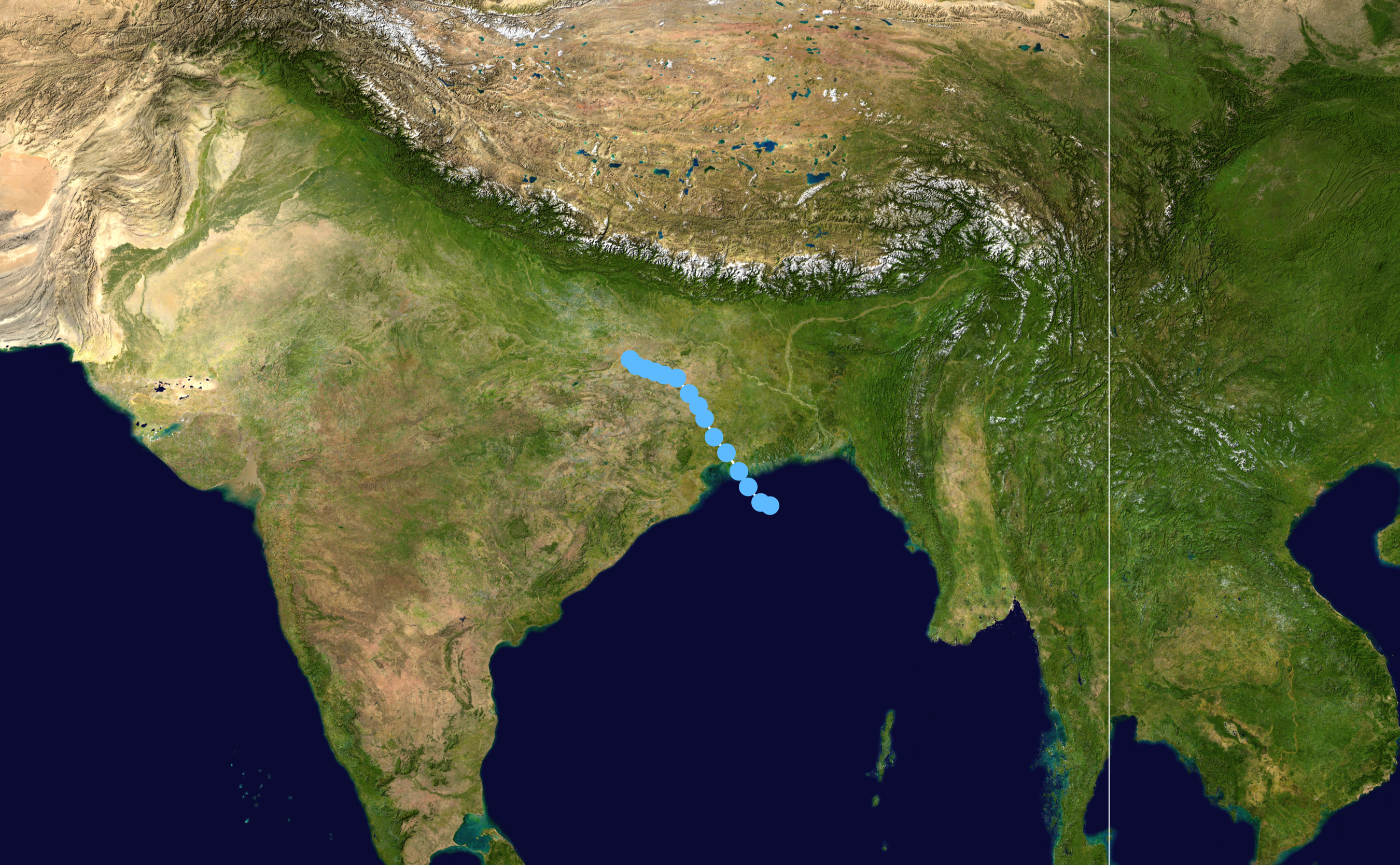
- Duration: June 23 – June 28
- Peak intensity: Winds not specified;

=== Depression Five ===
- Depression (IMD)
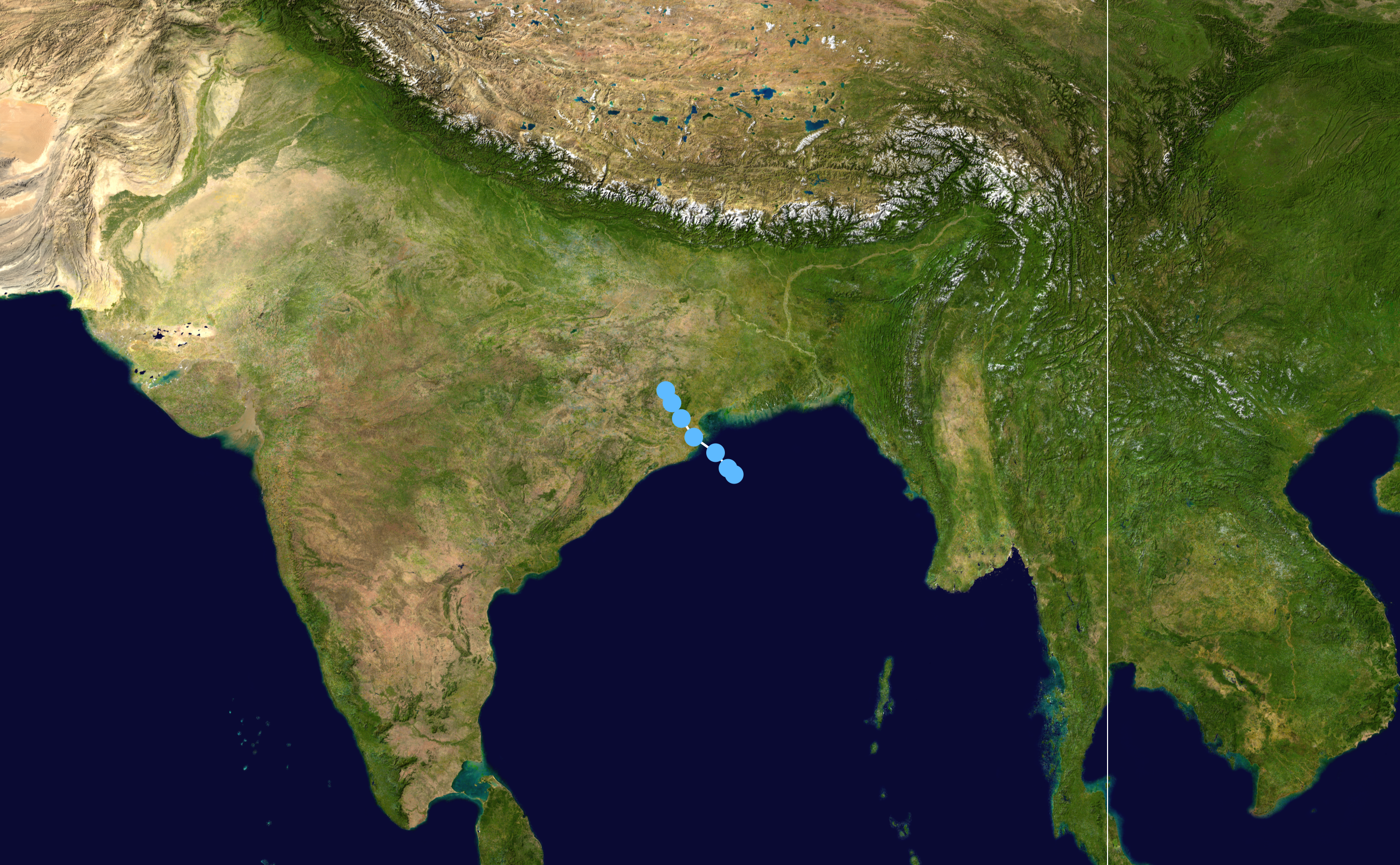
- Duration: July 10 – July 12
- Peak intensity: Winds not specified;

=== Land Depression Six ===
- Depression (IMD)
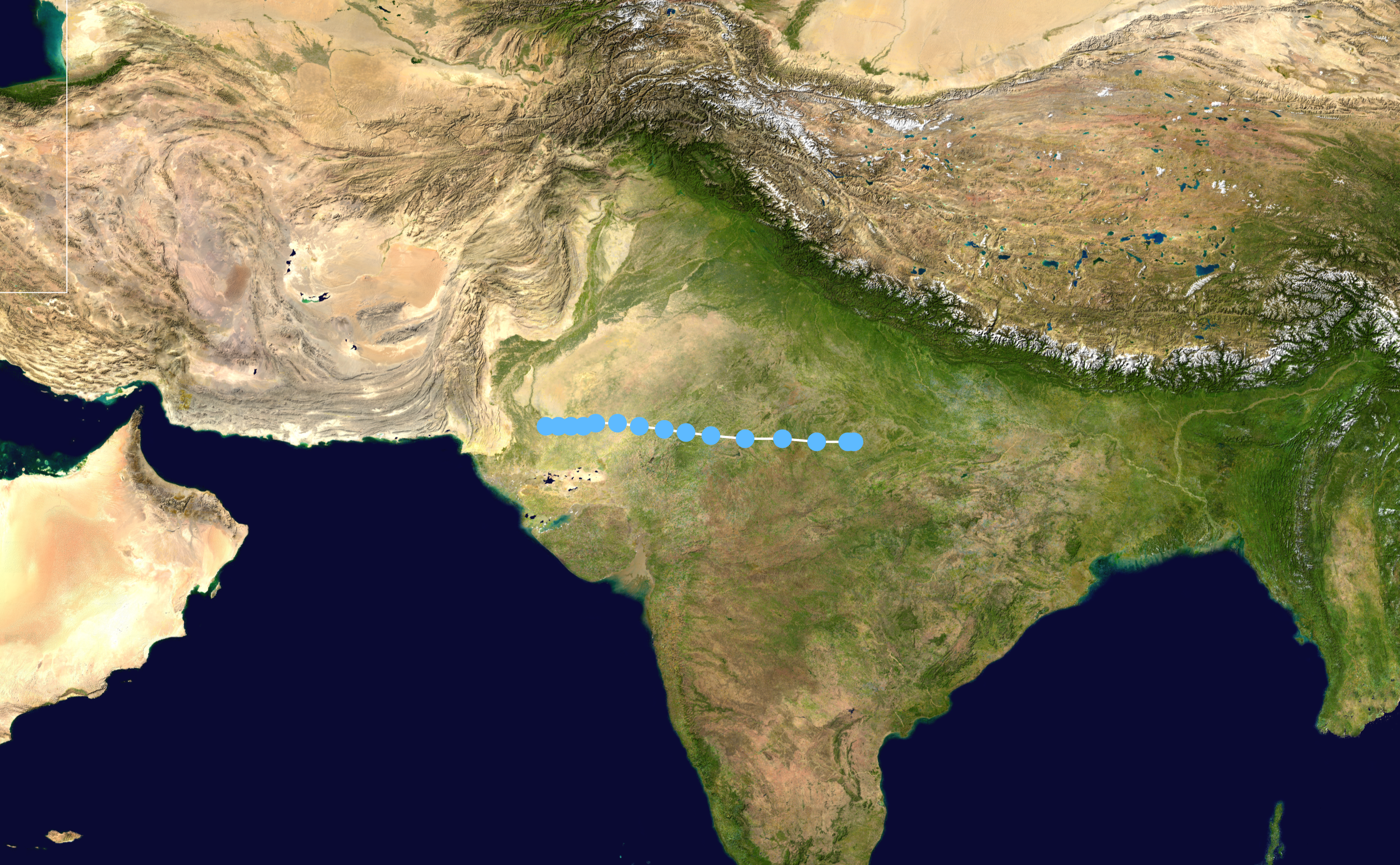
- Duration: July 11 – July 15
- Peak intensity: Winds not specified;

=== Depression Seven ===
- Depression (IMD)
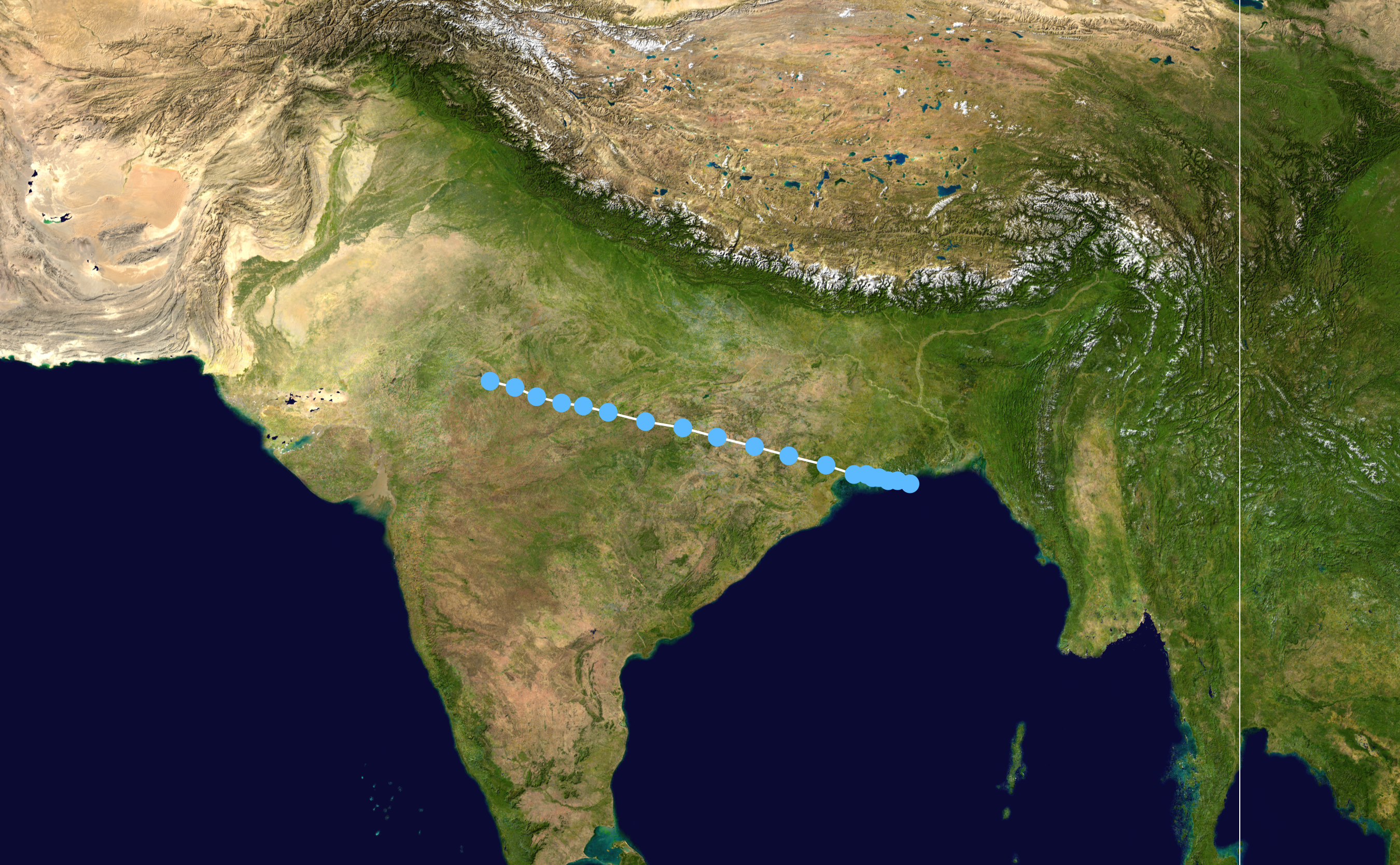
- Duration: July 25 – July 30
- Peak intensity: Winds not specified;

=== Land Depression Eight ===
- Depression (IMD)
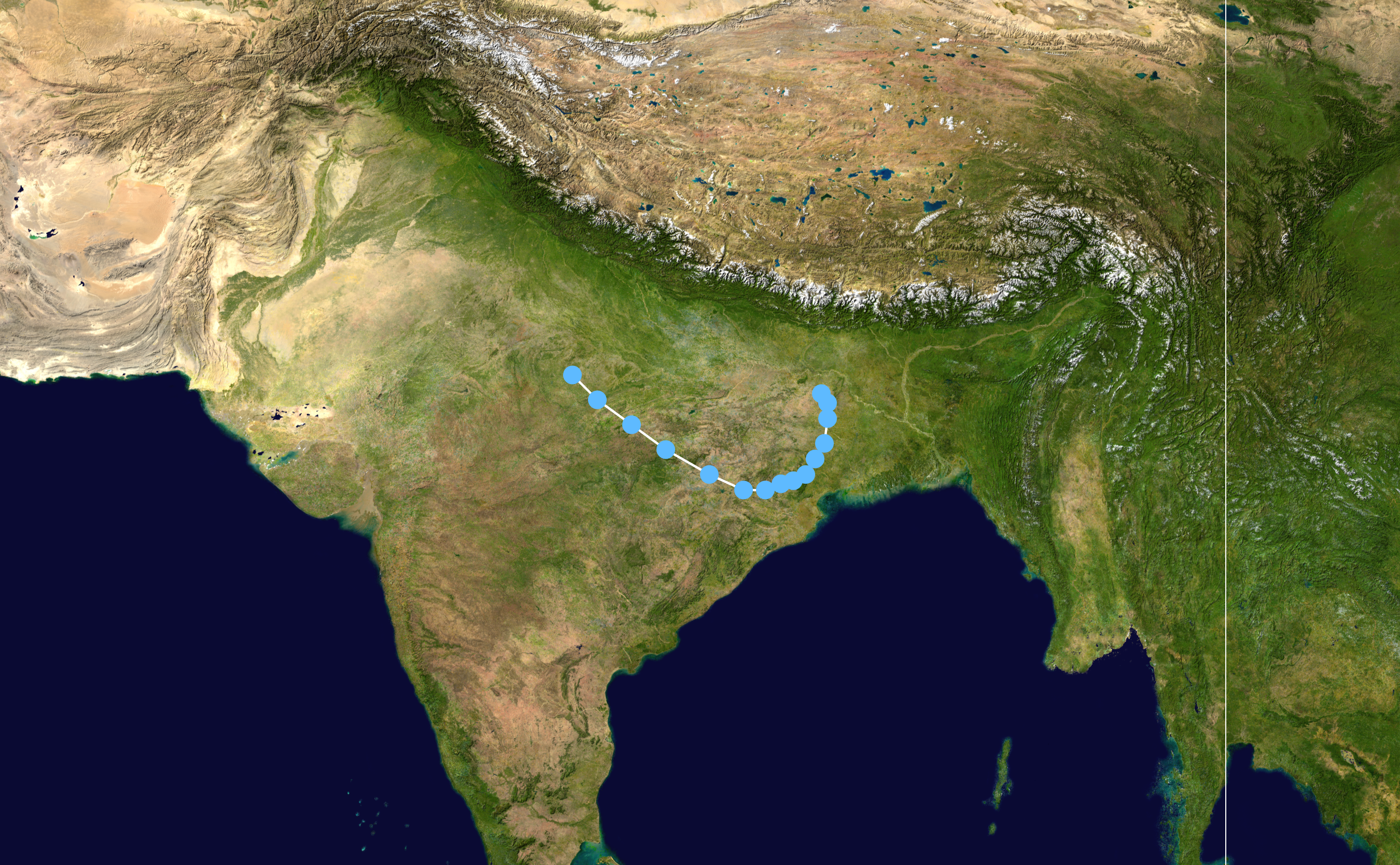
- Duration: August 3 – August 7
- Peak intensity: Winds not specified;

=== Depression Nine ===
- Depression (IMD)
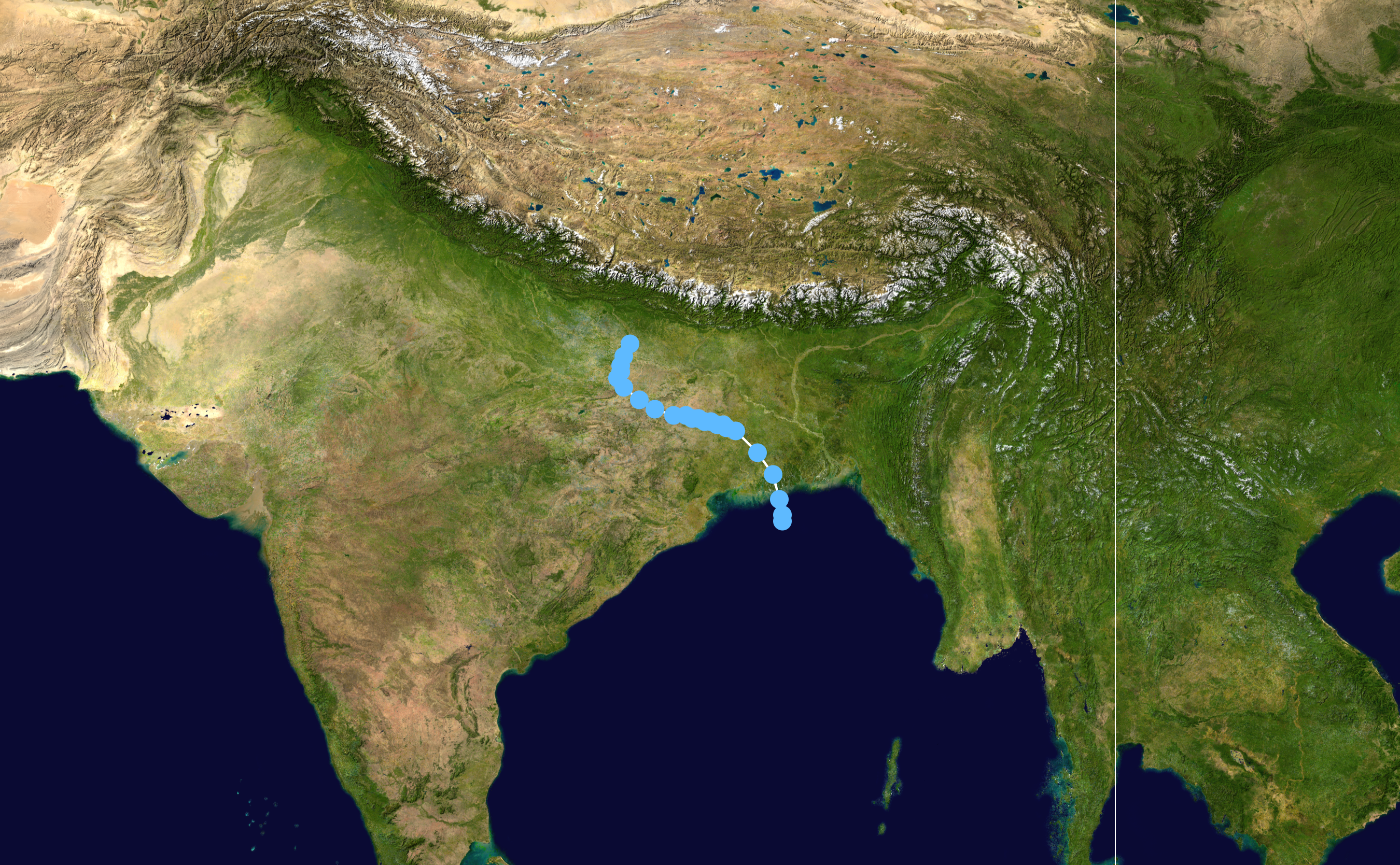
- Duration: August 9 – August 15
- Peak intensity: Winds not specified;

=== Land Depression Ten ===
- Depression (IMD)
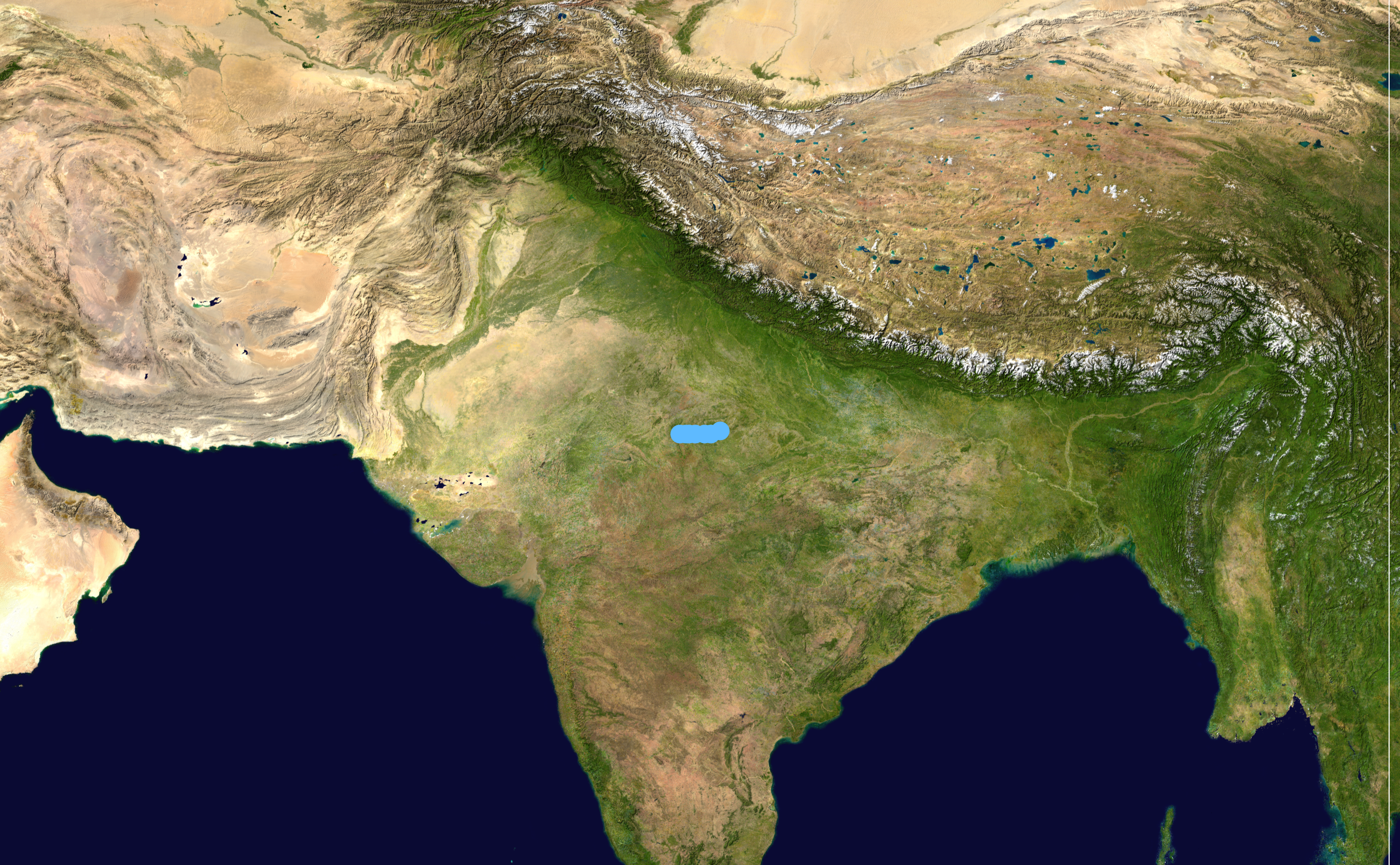
- Duration: September 1 – September 5
- Peak intensity: Winds not specified;

=== Depression Eleven ===
- Depression (IMD)
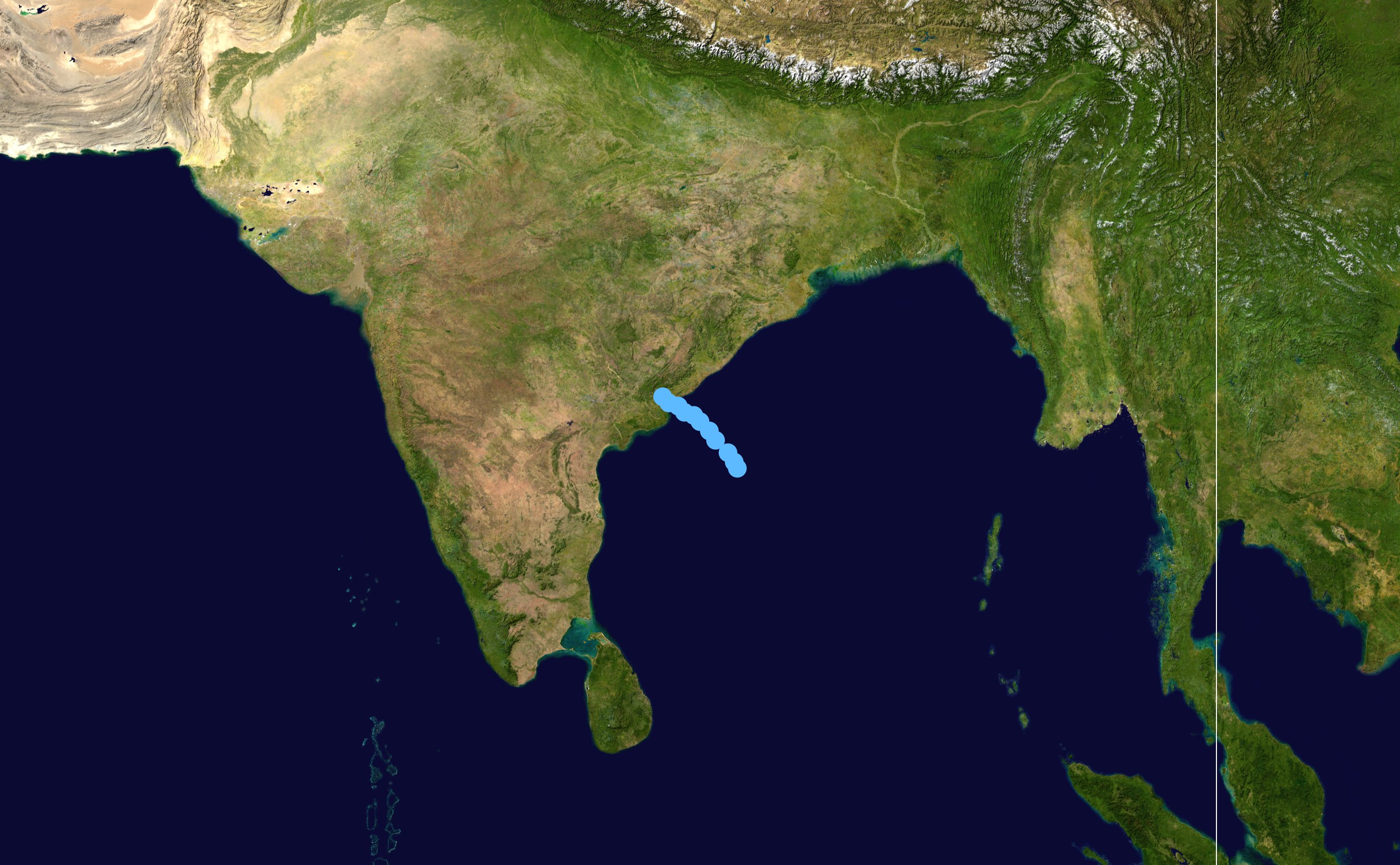
- Duration: September 9 – September 11
- Peak intensity: Winds not specified;

=== Cyclonic Storm Twelve ===
- Cyclonic storm (IMD)
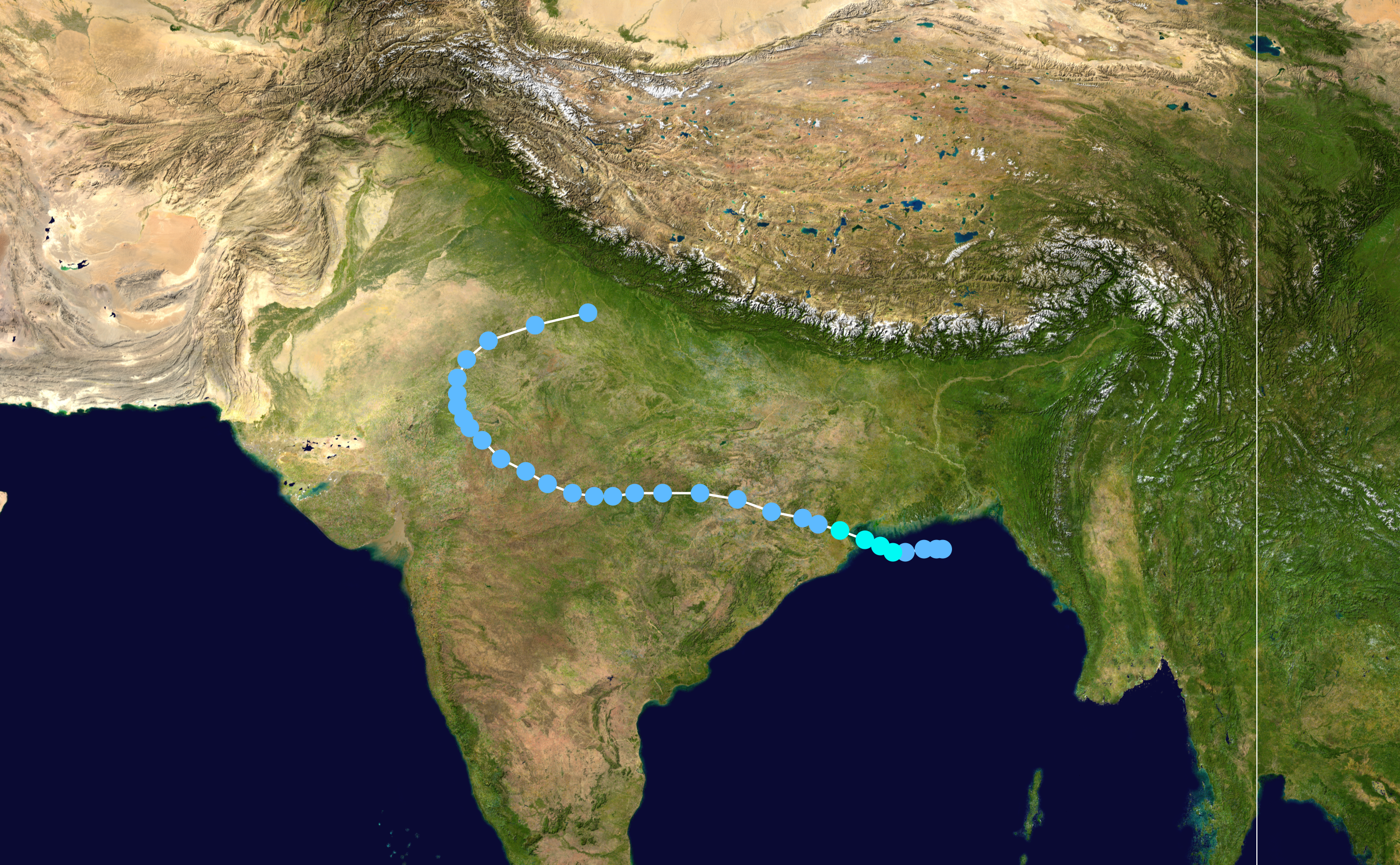
- Duration: September 12 – September 19
- Peak intensity: 75 km/h (45 mph) (3-min);

=== Depression Thirteen ===
- Depression (IMD)
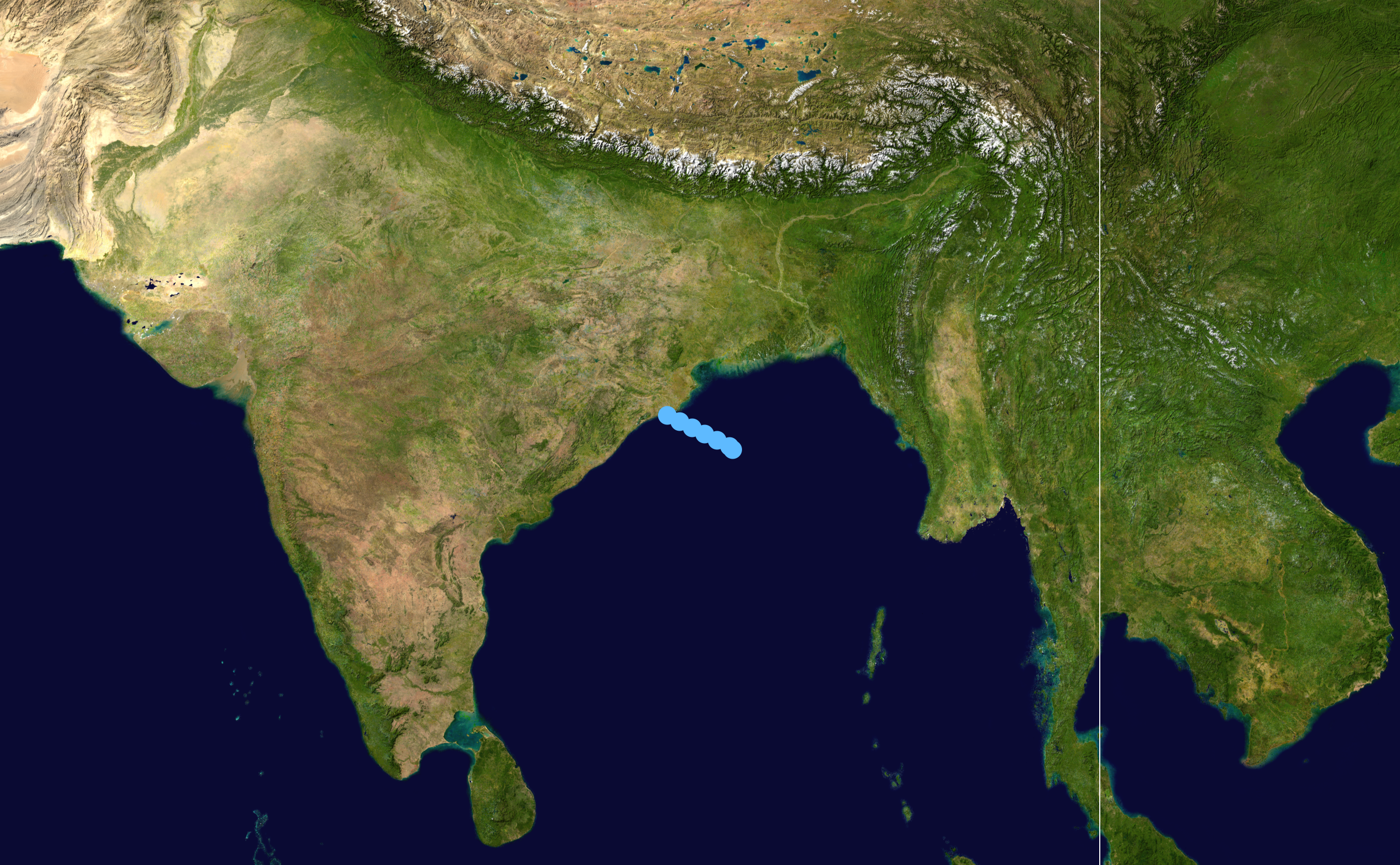
- Duration: September 22 – September 24
- Peak intensity: Winds not specified;

=== Depression Fourteen ===
- Depression (IMD)
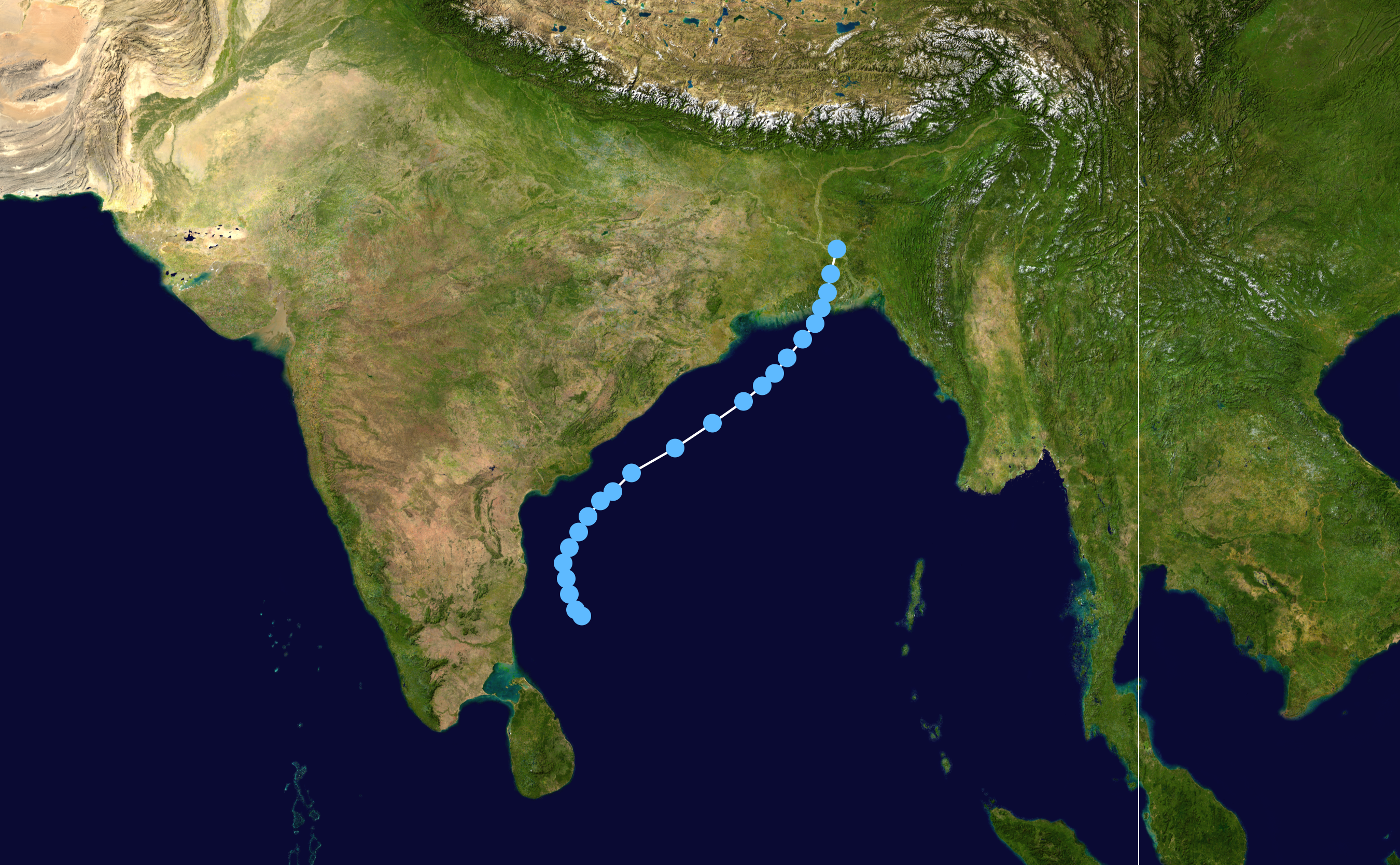
- Duration: October 17 – October 22
- Peak intensity: Winds not specified;

=== Cyclonic Storm Fifteen ===
- Cyclonic storm (IMD)
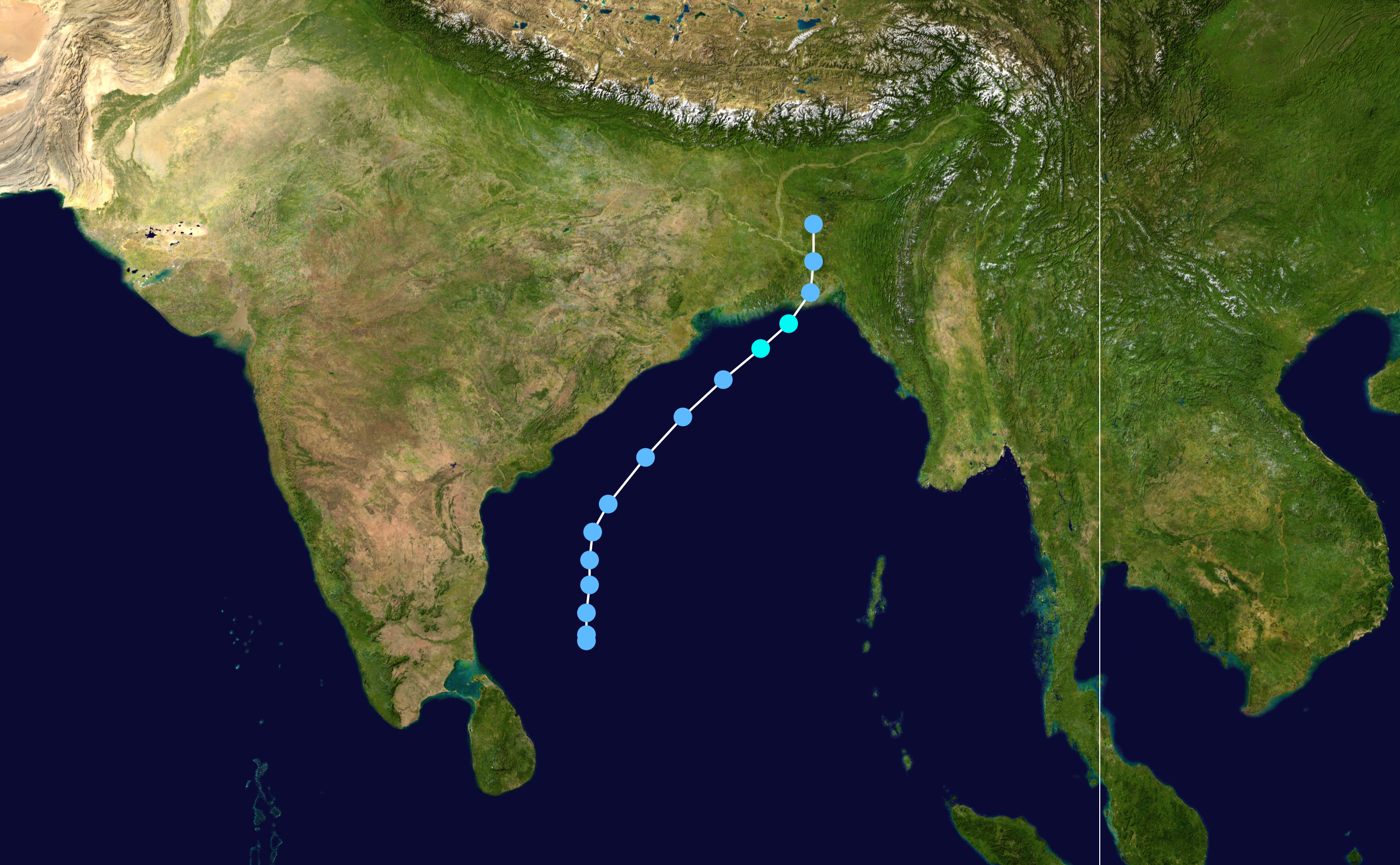
- Duration: November 16 – November 20
- Peak intensity: 85 km/h (50 mph) (3-min);

=== Cyclonic Storm Sixteen ===
- Severe cyclonic storm (IMD)
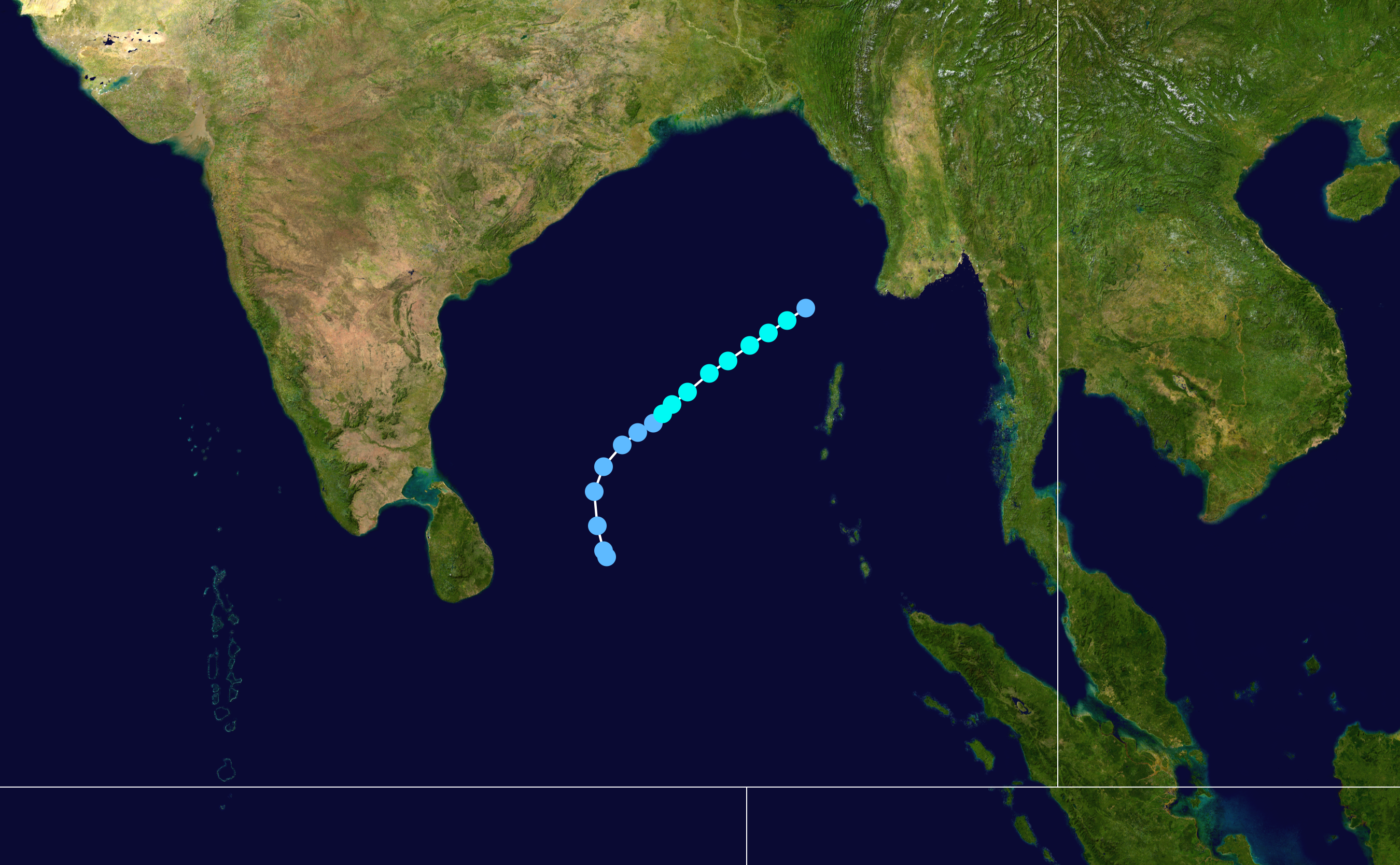
- Duration: December 2 – December 6
- Peak intensity: 95 km/h (60 mph) (3-min); 1000 hPa (mbar)

== See also ==
- Australian region cyclone seasons: 1949–50 1950–51
- South Pacific cyclone seasons: 1949–50 1950–51
- South-West Indian Ocean cyclone seasons: 1949–50 1950–51
