= 1950s Australian region cyclone seasons =

Seasonal boundaries
- First system formed: February 4, 1950

Seasonal statistics
- Total disturbances: 217
- Total fatalities: Unknown
- Total damage: Unknown

Related articles
- 1950s South-West Indian Ocean cyclone seasons; 1950s South Pacific cyclone seasons

The following is a list of all reported tropical cyclones within the Australian region between 90°E and 160°E in the 1950s.

== 1950–51 ==
- December 10–11, 1950 – A tropical cyclone passed overland to the west of Groote Eylandt, where hurricane-force winds generated a storm surge.
- January 10–24, 1951 – During January 10, a tropical cyclone moved into the Gulf of Carpentaria near Karumba. The system subsequently moved around the Gulf of Carpertaria, before it made landfall on Queensland near Karumba during January 22.
- January 25, 1951 – A tropical cyclone became slow moving near Fraser Island.
- February 20–28, 1951 – A tropical cyclone impacted the Solomon Islands, Vanuatu and New Caledonia.
- March 15, 1951 – A tropical cyclone made landfall on Queensland near Maryborough.
- March 24 – April 2, 1951 – A tropical cyclone impacted the Solomon Islands.

== 1951–52 ==
- January 19–20, 1952 – A tropical cyclone made landfall near Weipa before it passed over Normanton.
- March 3–12, 1952 – A possible tropical cyclone developed to the north-west of New Caledonia and moved south-eastwards, while located between Vanuatu and New Caledonia.

== 1952–53 ==
- October 26–28, 1952 – A tropical cyclone existed off the coast of Queensland, Australia.
- December 1952 – A tropical cyclone was reported to have caused extensive damage on Nissan Island.
- December 1–2, 1952 – A small tropical cyclone impacted Thursday Island.
- January 14, 1953 – A tropical cyclone made landfall on the Northern Territory near Mornington Island.
- March 1–9, 1953 – A tropical cyclone developed to the south of the Solomon Islands and moved south-eastwards to impact New Caledonia.
- March 22–23, 1953 – A tropical cyclone impacted Western Australia, where damage to banana plantations, windmills, houses and telegraph lines was estimated at £285 000.
- March 26–29, 1953 – A tropical cyclone moved southwards over Groote Eylandt.
- April 15–17, 1953 – A tropical cyclone moved from the Torres Strait to the northern coast of the Northern Territory.

== 1953–54 ==
- December 1953 – A tropical cyclone impacted the Solomon Islands of Florida and Guadalcanal.
- January 4–8, 1954 – A tropical cyclone moved southwards between Queensland and New Caledonia.
- February 7, 1954 – A tropical cyclone made landfall on Queensland to the south of Townsville.
- February 17–20, 1954 – A tropical cyclone made landfall on Queensland near Coolangatta.
- March 2–7, 1954 – A tropical cyclone that originated over the Coral Sea, caused gales over the sea between Norfolk Island and New Caledonia.

== 1954–55 ==
- December 31, 1954 – A tropical cyclone impacted Roebourne in Western Australia, where damage was estimated at £50 000.
- January 10–12, 1955 – A tropical cyclone remained near stationary to the north of Weipa.
- February 22–25, 1955 – A monsoon cyclone developed near Normanton and moved down through Queensland and into New South Wales.
- March 7, 1955 – A tropical cyclone made landfall on Queensland to the south of Mackay.
- March 23 – April 6, 1955 – A tropical cyclone developed over the Solomon Islands and moved southwestwards before it made landfall on Queensland near Bundaberg.

== 1955–56 ==
- December 25, 1955 – January 1, 1956 – A tropical cyclone developed near the Solomon Islands and erratically moved south-eastwards towards New Caledonia.
- January 16–17, 1956 – A tropical cyclone crossed the south-eastern coast of the Gulf of Carpentaria.
- January 21–28, 1956 – A tropical cyclone developed near Willis Island and erratically moved along 160°E.
- January 21–24, 1956 – A tropical cyclone developed to the northwest of New Caledonia and moved southwards.
- February 16 – March 5, 1956 – A tropical cyclone impacted parts of Western Australia and the Northern Territory.
- March 1, 1956 – A tropical cyclone moved parallel to the Pilbara coast, before heading down the west coast.
- March 25, 1956 – A tropical cyclone made landfall near Gove.
- April 3–7, 1956 – A tropical cyclone developed to the southeast of New Guinea and moved south-eastwards towards New Caledonia.
- April 6–9, 1956 – A tropical cyclone developed to the north of New Caledonia.
- March 6, 1956 – Tropical Cyclone Agnes.

== 1956–57 ==
- December 22–24, 1956 – A possible tropical cyclone moved from north Queensland to the south of New Caledonia.
- January 4–10, 1957 – A tropical cyclone developed over the Coral Sea and moved eastwards over New Caledonia.
- February 14, 1957 – A tropical cyclone passed directly over Broome, Western Australia and killed two people.
- February 19, 1957 – A tropical cyclone impacted New South Wales.

== 1957–58 ==
- December 16–19, 1957 – A tropical cyclone was identified off the coast of North-Western Australia, however, it did not develop any further and filled up during December 19.
- January 11–16, 1958 – A tropical cyclone moved from the Gulf of Carpentaria to the Kimberley in Western Australia.
- January 13–18, 1958 – A tropical cyclone existed in the north-eastern Coral Sea.
- January 15–22, 1958 – A tropical cyclone existed off the coast of Northwestern Australia.
- February 8–16, 1958 – A tropical cyclone existed over the Indian Ocean and impacted the Cocos Islands.
- February 12–24, 1958 – A tropical cyclone moved from the Gulf of Carpentaria and into the eastern Coral Sea.
- February 13–16, 1958 – A tropical cyclone existed over the Indian Ocean.
- March 1–5, 1958 – A tropical cyclone existed off the coast of Northwestern Australia and impacted Onslow.
- March 6–7, 1958 – A tropical cyclone impacted central Queensland.
- March 14–18, 1958 – A tropical cyclone existed off the coast of Northwestern Australia and impacted Onslow.
- March 18–20, 1958 – A tropical cyclone existed over the southern Coral Sea.
- March 31 – April 3, 1958 – A tropical cyclone moved from Willis Island to central Queensland where it impacted Bowen.
- April 2–11, 1958 – A tropical cyclone impacted the Solomon Islands, Vanuatu and Fiji.
- April 9, 1958 – A tropical cyclone existed in the north-eastern Coral Sea.
- April 11–16, 1958 – A tropical cyclone made landfall near Port Roper in the Northern Territory.
- April 17–23, 1958 – A tropical cyclone existed over the Coral Sea and impacted the Solomon Islands.
- June 4–15, 1958 – A tropical cyclone existed over the Coral Sea and impacted New Zealand as well as the Solomon Islands.

== 1958–59 ==
- October 1958 – A tropical cyclone impacted the Solomon Islands of Rennell and Vanikoro.
- November 17–23, 1958 – A tropical cyclone existed over the Indian Ocean near the Cocos Islands.
- December 30, 1958 – January 6, 1959 – A tropical cyclone existed over the Indian Ocean near Christmas Island and the Cocos Islands.
- January 4–12, 1959 – A tropical cyclone existed over the Timor Sea and impacted the Northern Territory as well as the Kimberley.
- January 4–23, 1959 – A tropical cyclone existed over Northern Australia and the Coral Sea.
- January 15–21, 1959 – A tropical cyclone impacted Vanuatu, New Caledonia and New South Wales.
- January 16–19, 1959 – A tropical cyclone entered the Gulf of Carpentaria near Mornington Island, before it made landfall on the south-eastern Gulf Of Carpentaria near the Gilbert River.
- January 20, 1959 – A tropical cyclone moved into the Coral Sea from the Gulf of Carpentaria between Cooktown and Cairns.
- January 21, 1959 – Tropical Cyclone Beatrice.
- February 8–12, 1959 – A tropical cyclone existed over the Indian Ocean near the Cocos Islands.
- February 11–19, 1959 – A tropical cyclone existed over the Coral Sea and impacted Eastern Australia.
- March 5–12, 1959 – A tropical cyclone existed over the Indian Ocean.
- March 5–16, 1959 – A tropical cyclone impacted the Solomon Islands and New Caledonia.
- March 7–14, 1959 – Tropical Cyclone Ida.
- March 16–24, 1959 – A tropical cyclone existed off the coast of Northwestern Australia.
- April 2–11, 1959 – A tropical cyclone existed in the Arafura Sea and impacted the Kimberleys and Northwestern Australia.

== 1959–60 ==
- December 19–30, 1959 – A tropical cyclone impacted the Solomon Islands, Vanuatu and Fiji.
- December 24, 1959 – January 4, 1960 – A tropical cyclone moved eastwards across the Gulf of Carpentaria and the Cape York Peninsular, before impacting Vanuatu.
- January 22–29, 1960 – A tropical cyclone existed off the coast of Northwestern Australia.
- February 27 – March 5, 1960 – Tropical Cyclone Erika.
- March 3–9, 1960 – A tropical cyclone existed within the Coral Sea and impacted Queensland.
- March 14–28, 1960 – A tropical cyclone existed over the Coral Sea and moved over northern Australia into the Indian Ocean.
- April 2–10, 1960 – Tropical Cyclone Gina.
- April 4–8, 1960 – A tropical cyclone existed over the Indian Ocean near the Cocos Islands.
- April 21–27, 1960 – A tropical cyclone existed over the Timor Sea and was encountered by a ship called the Straat Jahore.

== See also ==
- Australian region tropical cyclone
- Atlantic hurricane seasons: 1950, 1951, 1952, 1953, 1954, 1955, 1956, 1957, 1958, 1959
- Eastern Pacific hurricane seasons: 1950, 1951, 1952, 1953, 1954, 1955, 1956, 1957, 1958, 1959
- Western Pacific typhoon seasons: 1950, 1951, 1952, 1953, 1954, 1955, 1956, 1957, 1958, 1959
- North Indian Ocean cyclone seasons: 1950, 1951, 1952, 1953, 1954, 1955, 1956, 1957, 1958, 1959
