= 1950 Pacific hurricane season =

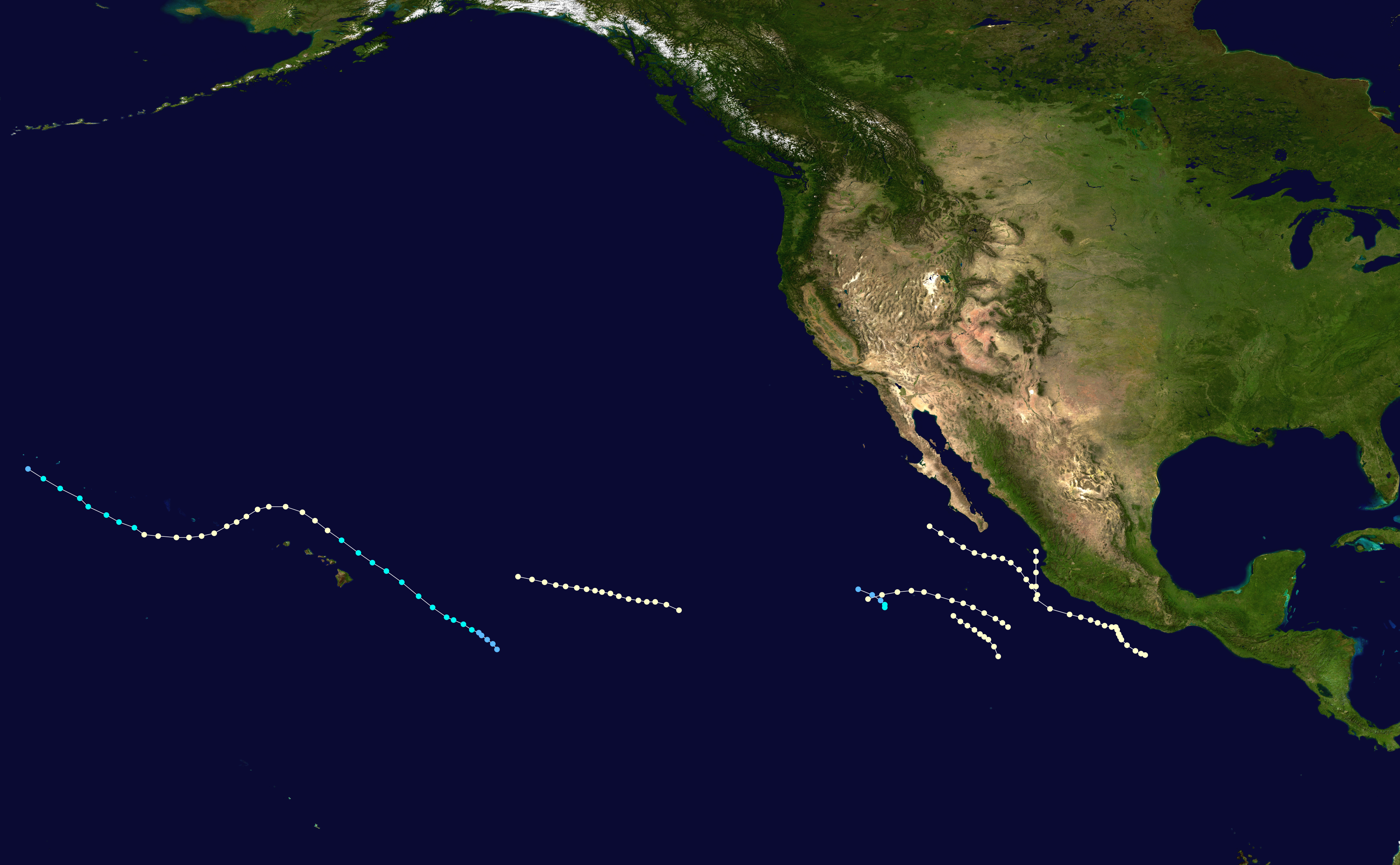
- Season summary map

Seasonal boundaries
- First system formed: June 14, 1950
- Last system dissipated: October 3, 1950

Strongest storm
- Name: One, Two, Three, Hiki, Six, Seven
  - Maximum winds: 85 mph (140 km/h)

Seasonal statistics
- Total storms: 7
- Hurricanes: 6
- Major hurricanes (Cat. 3+): 0
- Total fatalities: 1
- Total damage: Unknown

Related articles
- 1950 Atlantic hurricane season; 1950 Pacific typhoon season; 1950 North Indian Ocean cyclone season

The 1950 Pacific hurricane season was a season which was notable for having the third-wettest tropical cyclone in United States history, Hurricane Hiki. Seven known tropical cyclones occurred during the season, the earliest of which formed on June 14 and the latest of which dissipated on October 3. These dates fall within the range of most Eastern Pacific tropical cyclone activity.

== Season summary ==
Only seven tropical cyclones were observed in the Eastern Pacific during this season, which is well below the 1995–2008 average of 15 per year. However, it is likely that other tropical cyclones in the Central or Eastern Pacific basin in 1950 went operationally unnoticed, due to small tropical cyclone size, sparse ship reports, relatively unpopulated coastlines, and lack of modern technology. Of the seven tropical cyclones, six attained hurricane status. None of the tropical cyclones became a major hurricane, which is Category 3 or greater on the Saffir–Simpson scale. In addition, a tropical cyclone developed within the Central Pacific basin. Similar to 1949, most of the seven tropical cyclones did not differentiate significantly in intensity during the duration, with the exception of Tropical Storm Five.

Although there were no conventional date limits of an Eastern Pacific hurricane season, tropical cyclone activity began almost a month after the dates of the season set in subsequent years, from May 15-November 30. The first tropical cyclone of the season formed mid-June, and two more developed in the month of July. No tropical cyclogenesis occurred for 30 days, and ended with Hurricane Hiki developing on August 12, followed by a quick succession of two more tropical cyclones. No tropical cyclones developed in the Eastern Pacific basin in month of September, records show that this is the only known occurrence of such a meteorological oddity. The season ended after a hurricane developed on October 1 and dissipated two days later.

== Systems ==
=== Hurricane One ===
- Category 1 hurricane (SSHWS)
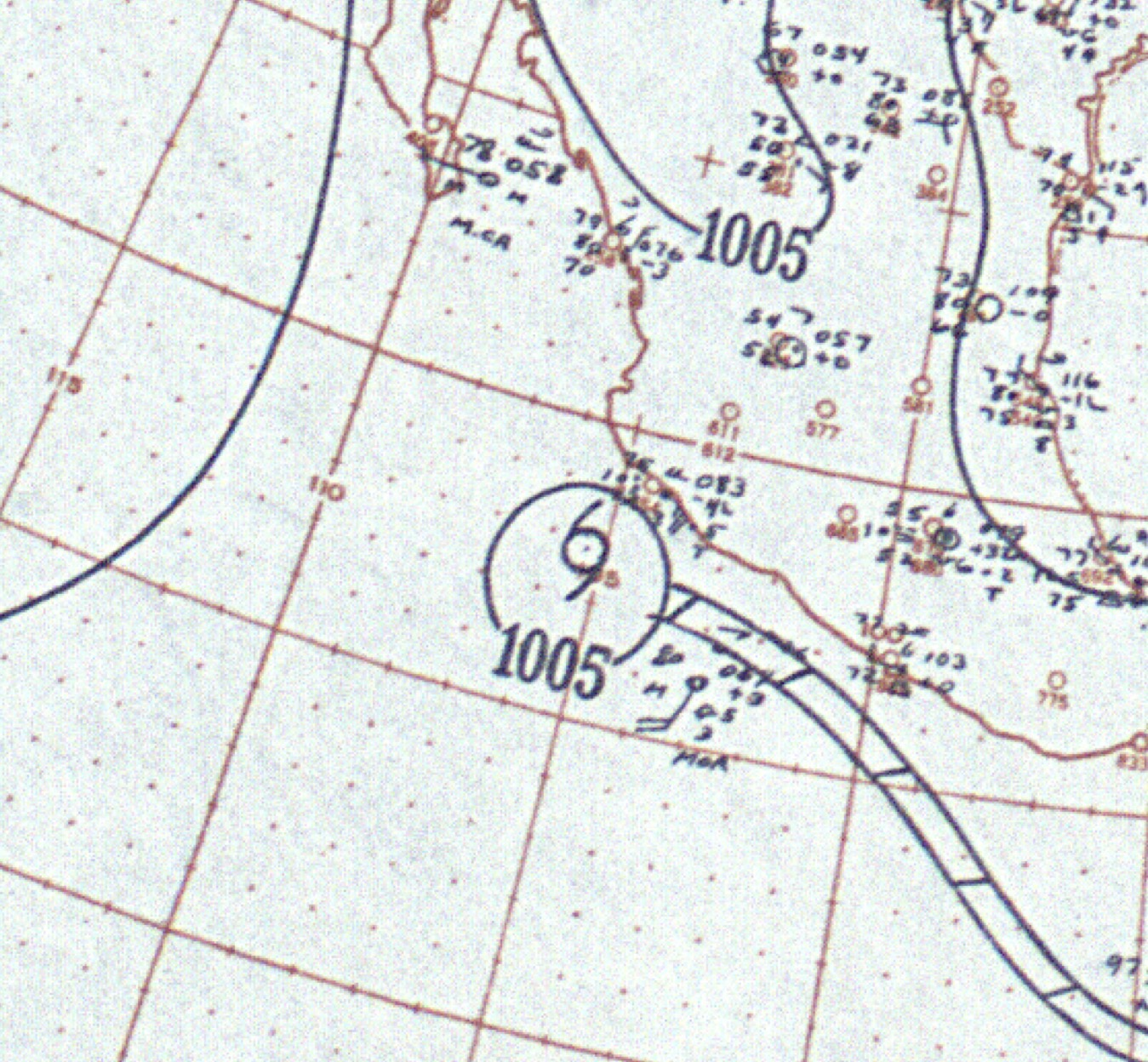
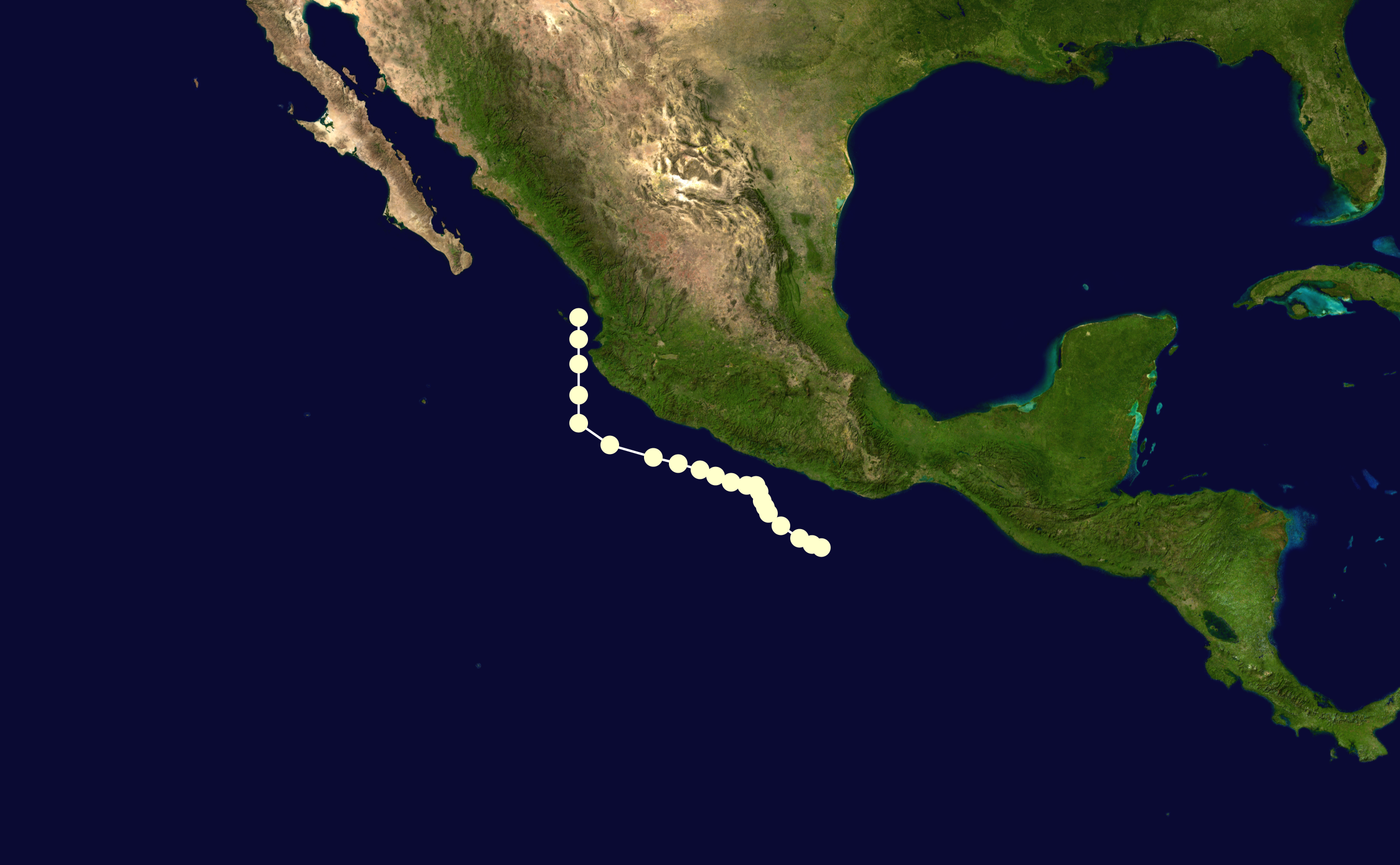
- Duration: June 14 – June 19
- Peak intensity: 85 mph (140 km/h) (1-min);

The first tropical cyclone of the season was initially noted on June 14, located 158 mi (254.27 km) southwest of Puerto Ángel, Mexico. Hurricane One headed north-northwestward toward the coast of Mexico, but veered away near Acapulco on June 16. After veering away from Mexico, the hurricane began to parallel the coastline, until curving due north. On June 19, the hurricane passed within 20 mi (32.18 km) of Isla Maria Cleofas in the archipelago of Islas Marías offshore of Mexico. Hurricane One dissipated shortly thereafter.

=== Hurricane Two ===
- Category 1 hurricane (SSHWS)
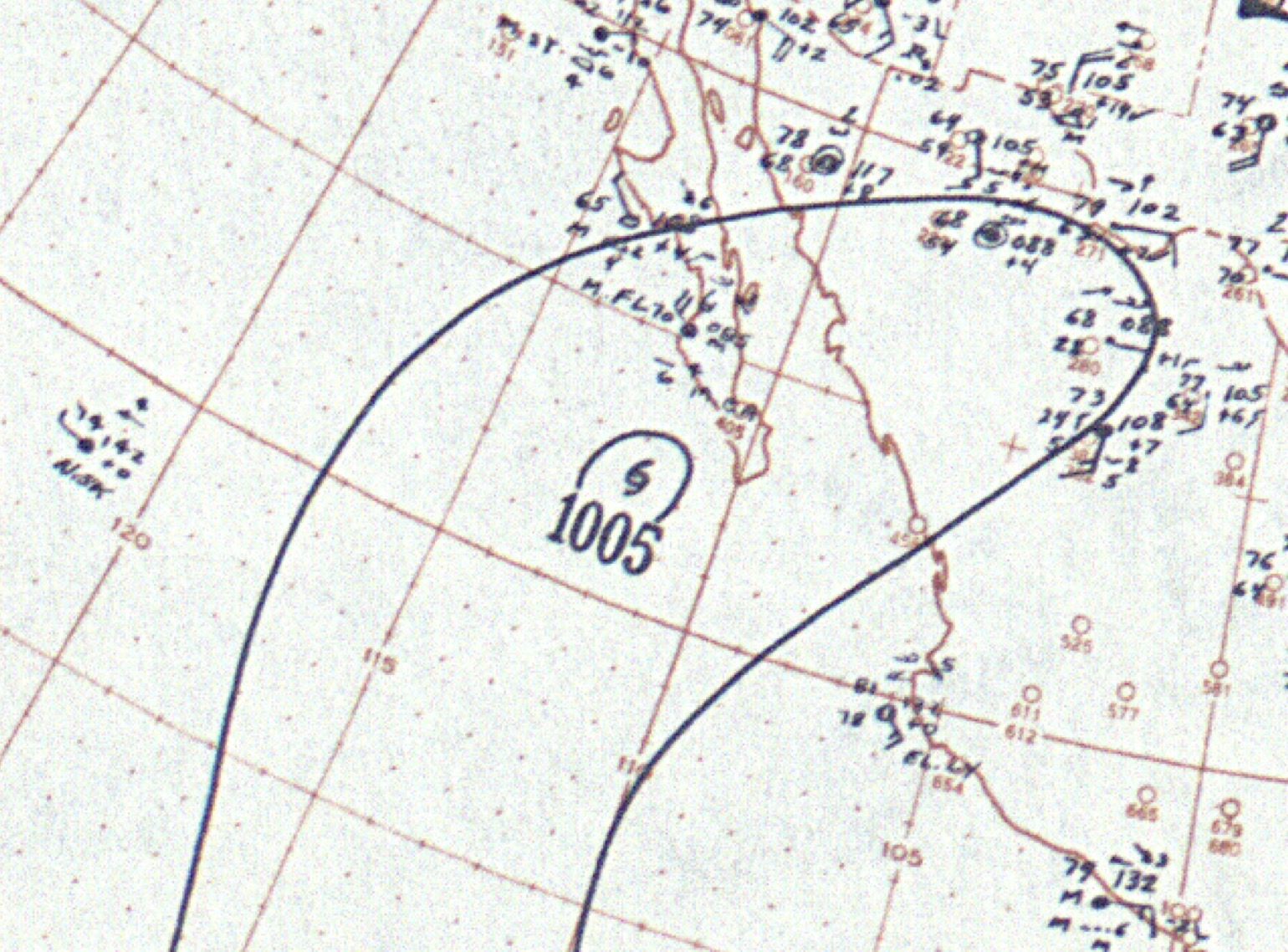
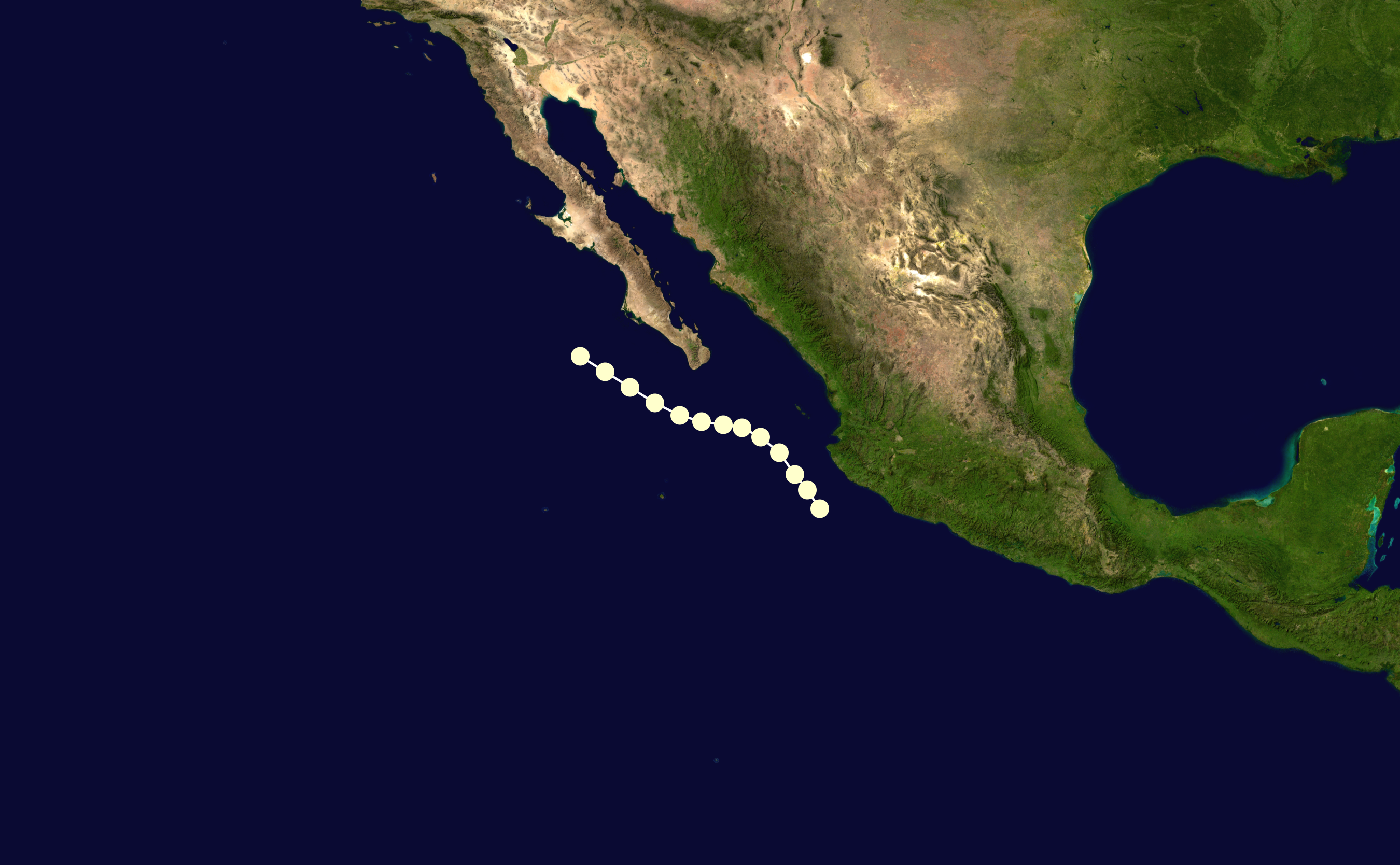
- Duration: July 3 – July 6
- Peak intensity: 85 mph (140 km/h) (1-min);

The second tropical cyclone of the season developed 113 mi (182 km) southwest of Manzanillo, Colima on July 3. Similar to Hurricane One, this storm paralleled the coast of Mexico and then headed out to sea. Hurricane Two later headed northwestward, and paralleled Baja California. The hurricane dissipated July 6, 240 mi (386.24 km) north-northwest of Cabo San Lucas.

=== Hurricane Three ===
- Category 1 hurricane (SSHWS)
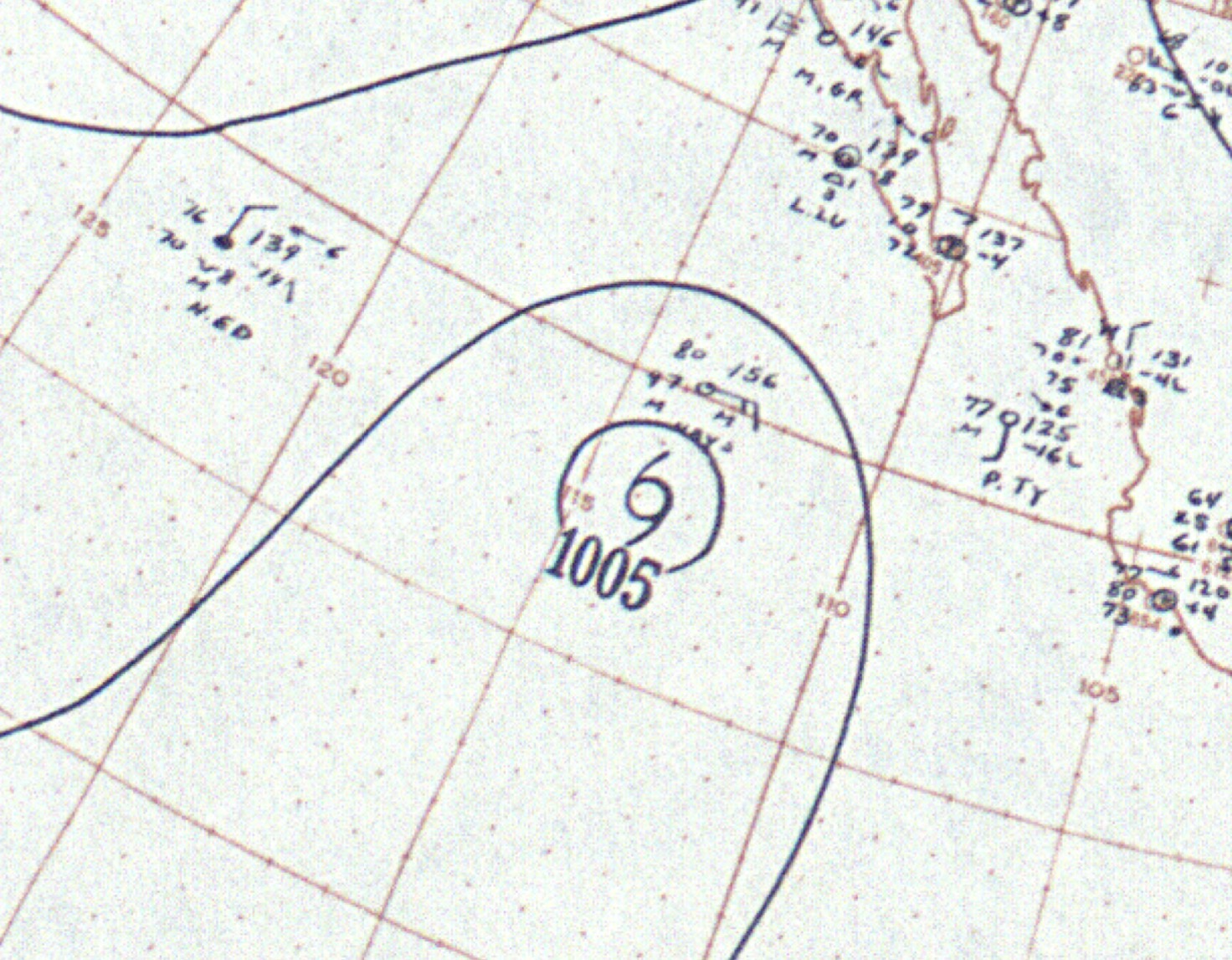
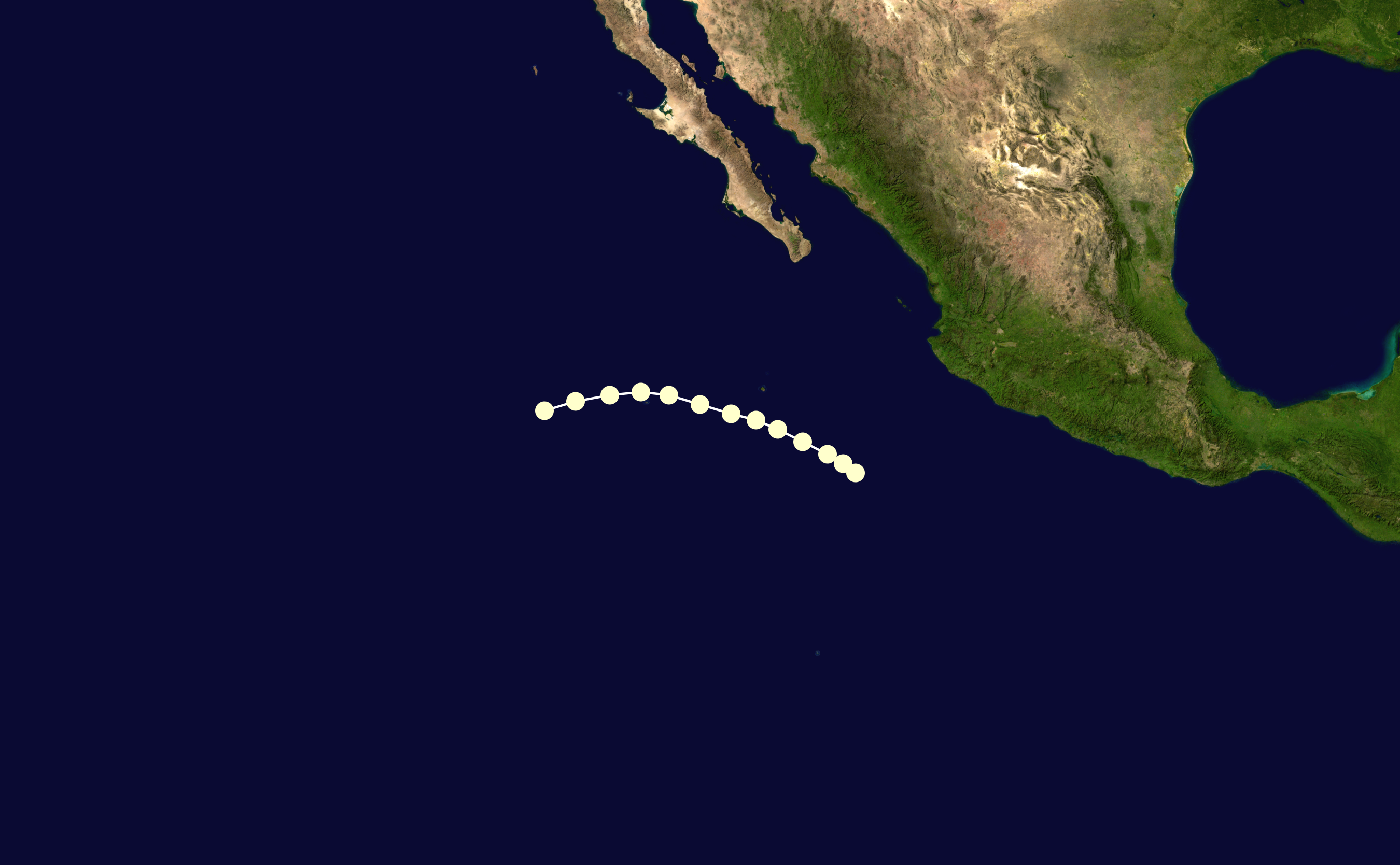
- Duration: July 9 – July 12
- Peak intensity: 85 mph (140 km/h) (1-min);

Hurricane Three was first observed 270 mi (434.52 km) south-southeast of Socorro Island on July 9. The hurricane passed within 70 mi (112.65 km) of Socorro Island on July 10. After passing near the island, the hurricane headed out into the open Pacific Ocean. Hurricane Three eventually dissipated on July 12.

=== Hurricane Hiki ===
- Category 1 hurricane (SSHWS)
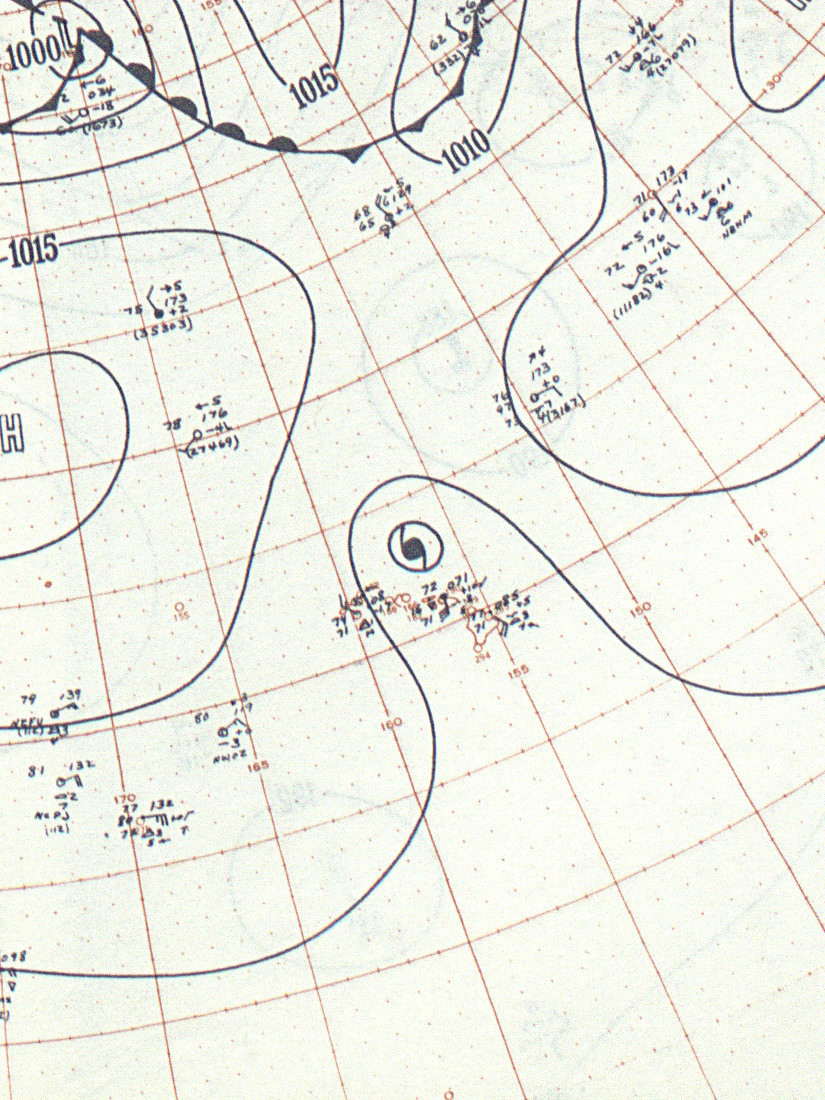
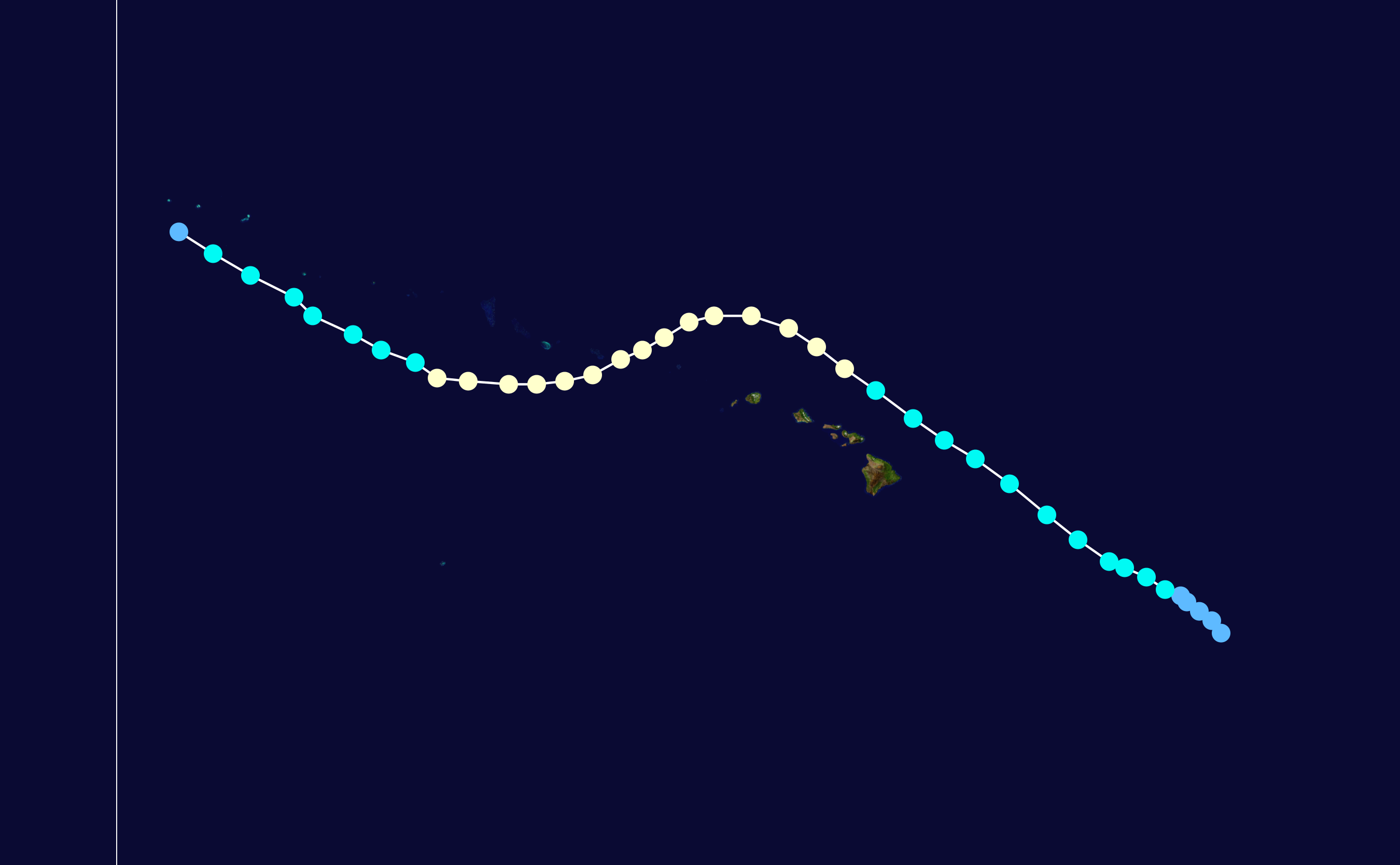
- Duration: August 12 – August 21
- Peak intensity: 85 mph (140 km/h) (1-min); 982 mbar (hPa)

A tropical depression formed over the Central Pacific on August 12, southeast of Hawaii. It tracked west-northwestward, strengthening to become Tropical Storm Hiki the next day (Hawaiian for Able). Hiki reached hurricane strength while a short distance north of the islands. A small hurricane, it paralleled the islands until August 17, when a high pressure system forced the storm southwestward. As the high receded, Hiki moved to the northwest and dissipated on August 21.

The hurricane was also followed by the Air Weather Service, located on Guam. As described in "Report on the Post Analysis of Typhoons in the Western North Pacific −1950" this system was also assigned the name Salome from the North West Pacific Typhoon name list for 1950. The name Salome is not widely known and the system is usually referred to as Hiki.

The heaviest known rainfall from a tropical cyclone on the state of Hawaii occurred with Hiki, when over 52 in (1,320 mm) fell at Kanalohuluhulu Ranger Station. It was the highest amount in the state’s history until Hurricane Lane in 2018. Moderate damage was seen on Hawaii, and one person died.

=== Tropical Storm Four ===
- Tropical storm (SSHWS)
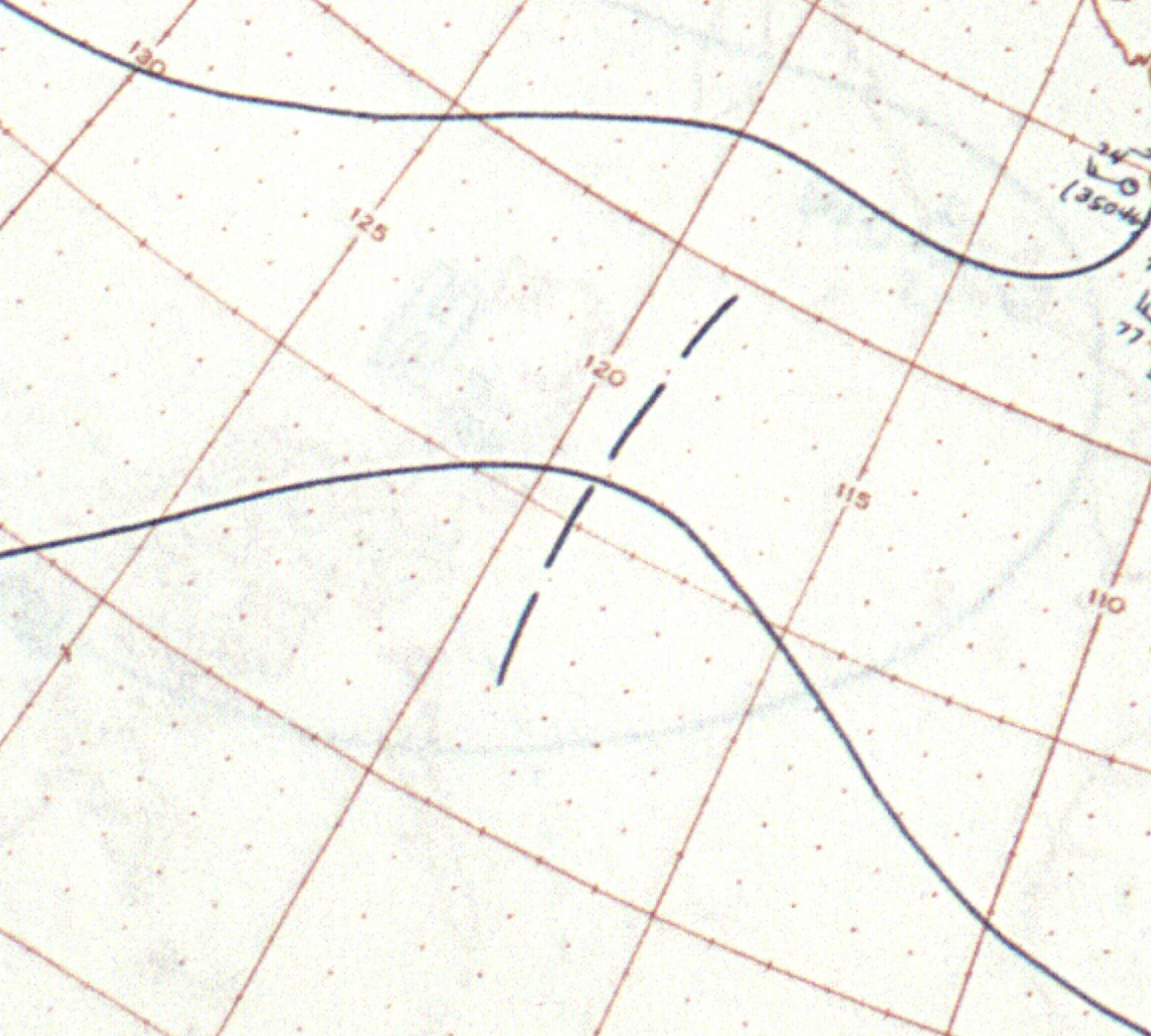
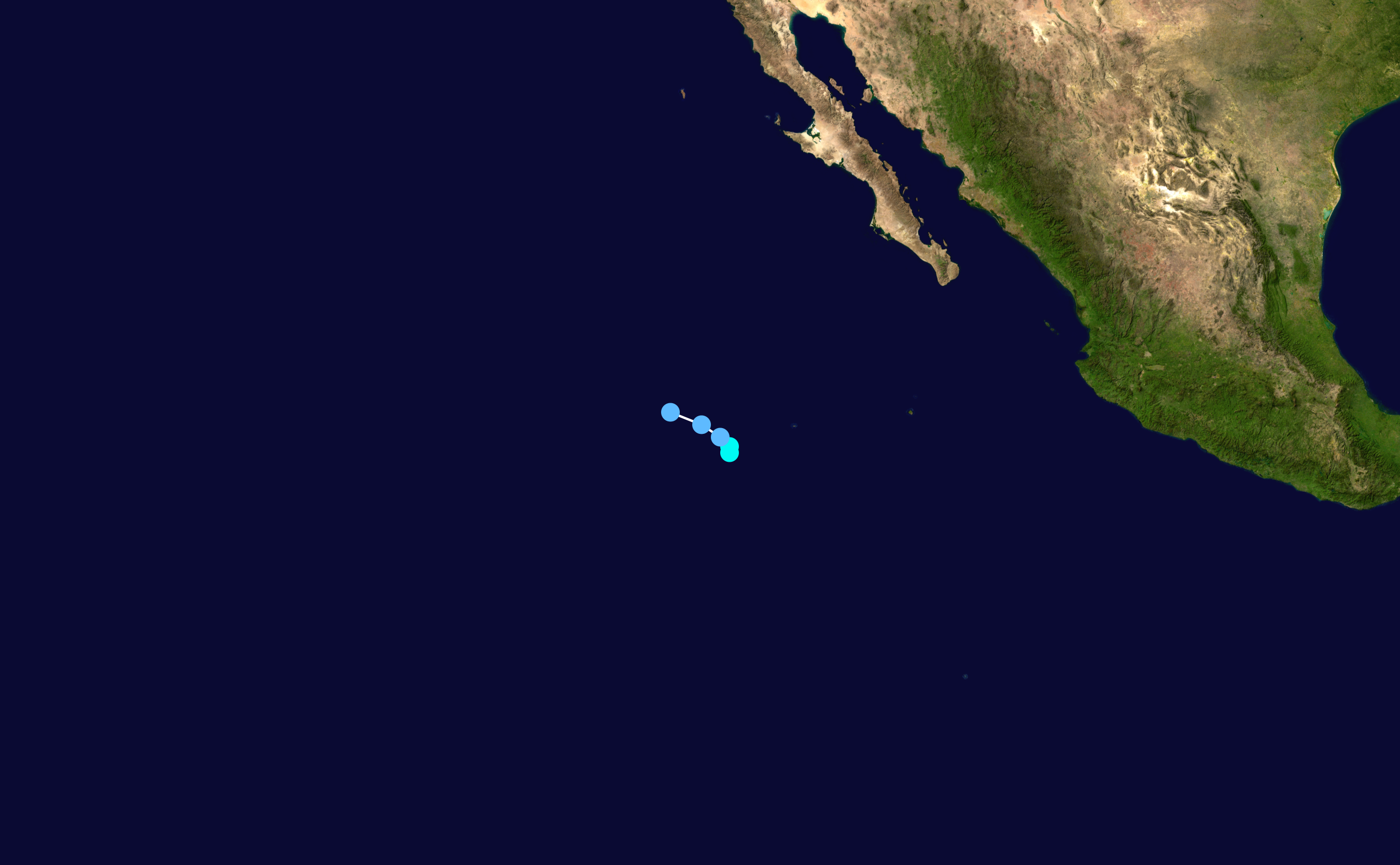
- Duration: August 12 – August 13
- Peak intensity: 50 mph (85 km/h) (1-min);

The only tropical cyclone that failed to intensify into a hurricane developed on August 12, 394 mi (634 km) south-southwest of Socorro Island. By early on August 13, the system had weakened, and was downgraded to a tropical depression only twelve hours after forming. The storm dissipated 707 mi (1137.80 km) south of Guadalupe Island later that day.

=== Hurricane Six ===
- Category 1 hurricane (SSHWS)
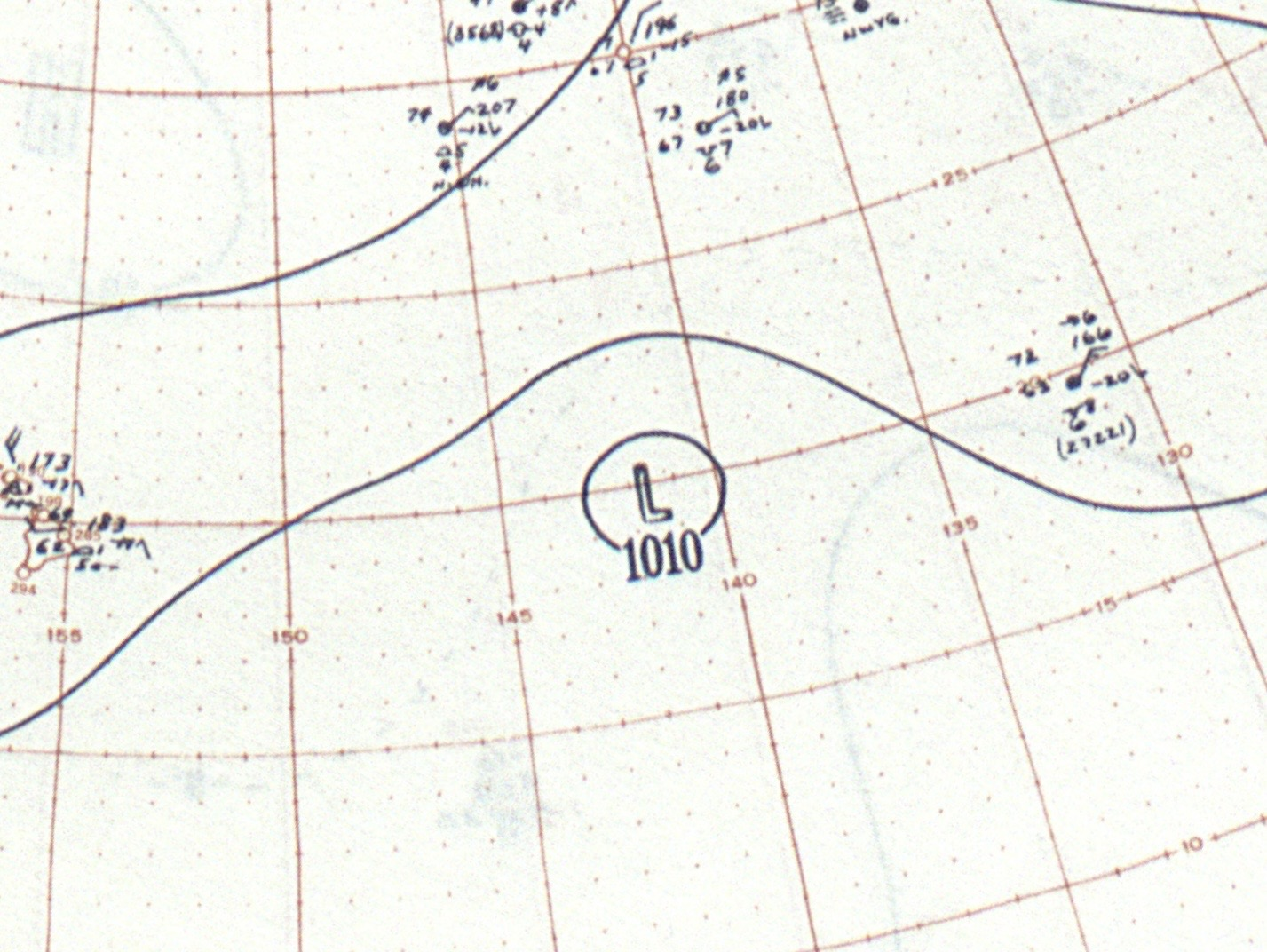
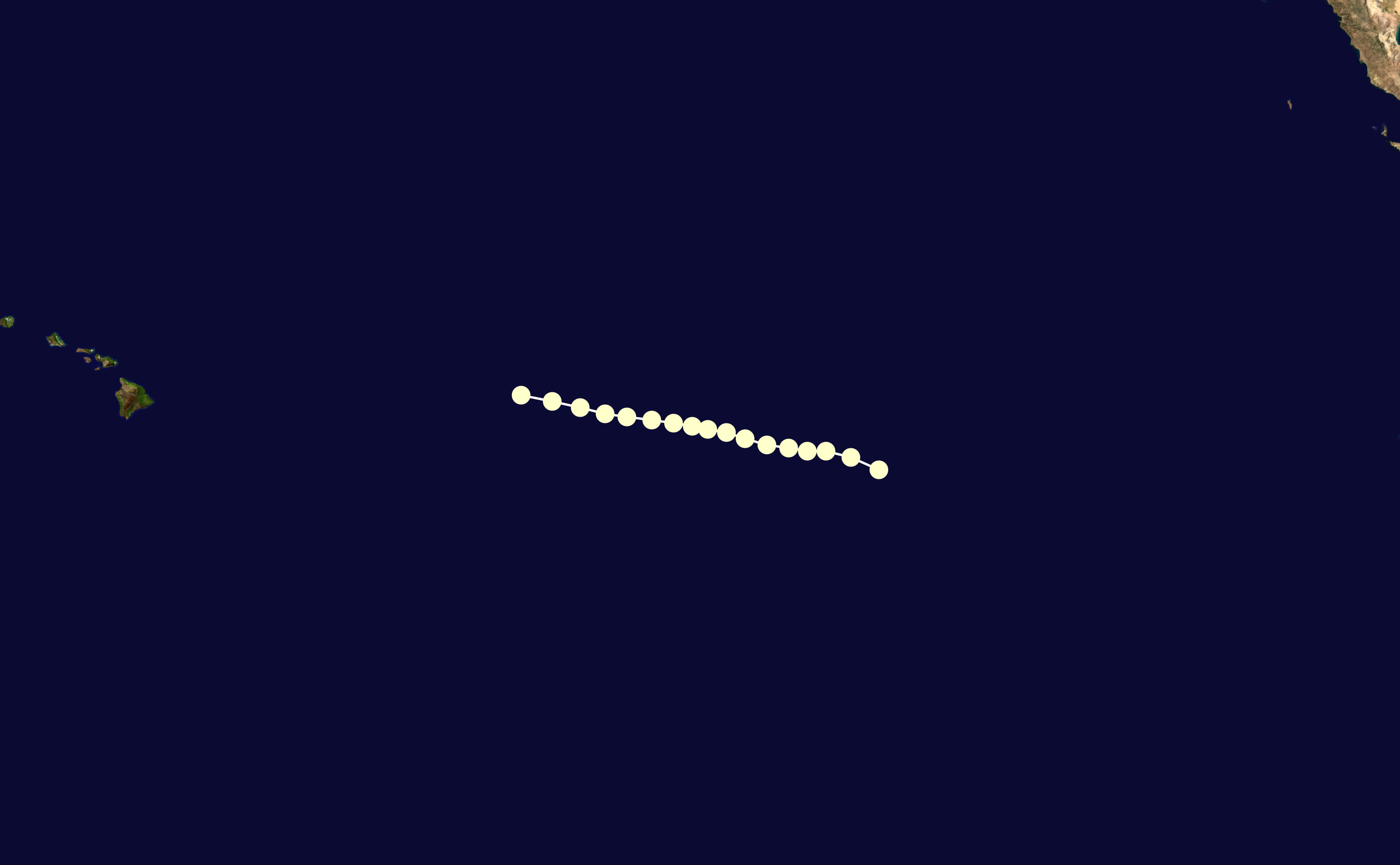
- Duration: August 26 – August 30
- Peak intensity: 85 mph (140 km/h) (1-min);

Hurricane Six was first observed 1,590 mi (2,556.85 km) south-southeast of Ka Lae on August 26. The hurricane headed generally north-northwestward with no change in intensity. By August 29, Hurricane Six crossed 140°W, which would become the Central Pacific Hurricane Center's forecast area in 1970. Hurricane six dissipated 788 mi (1,268.16 km) east of Hilo, Hawaii on August 30.

=== Hurricane Seven ===
- Category 1 hurricane (SSHWS)
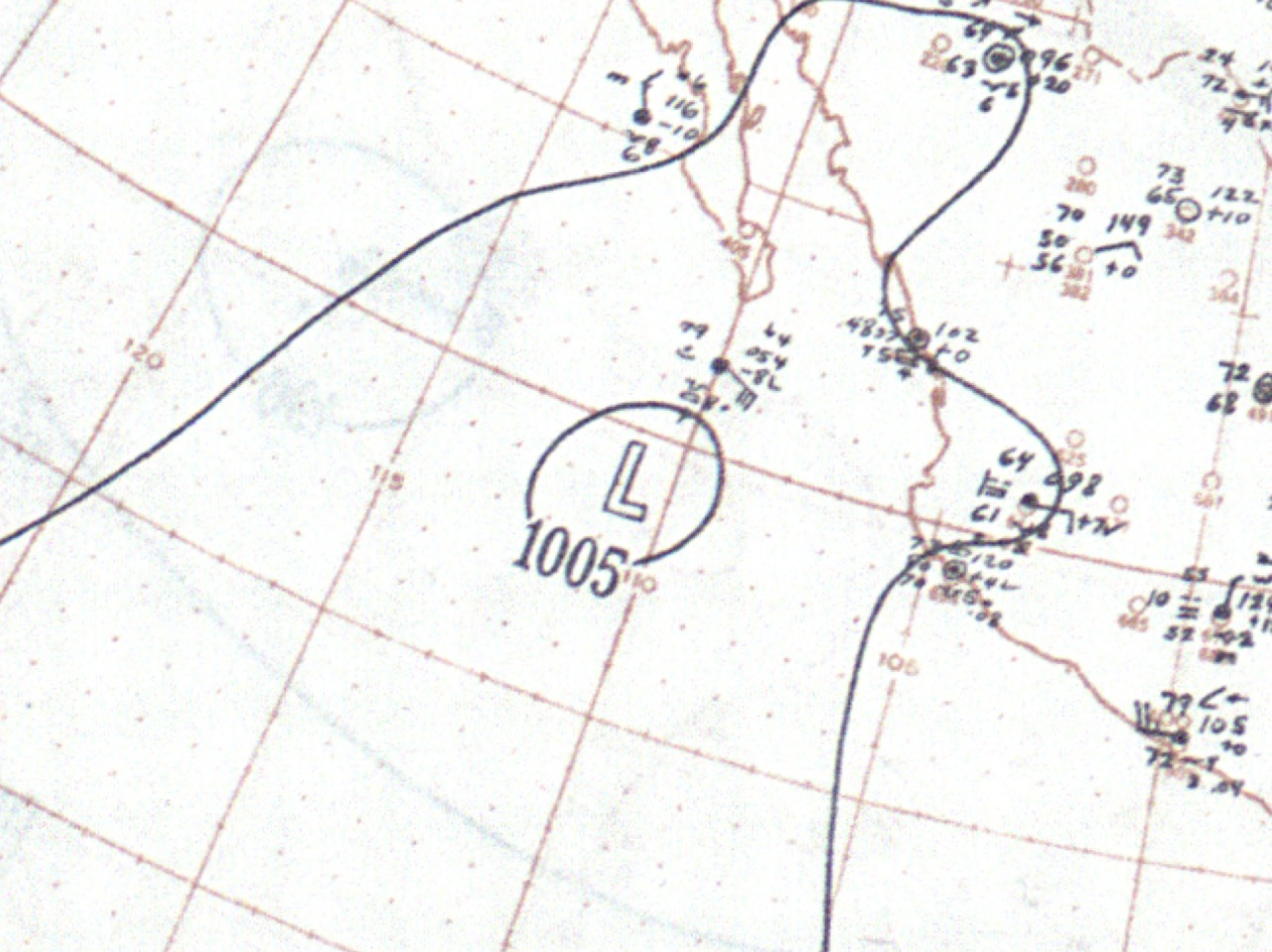
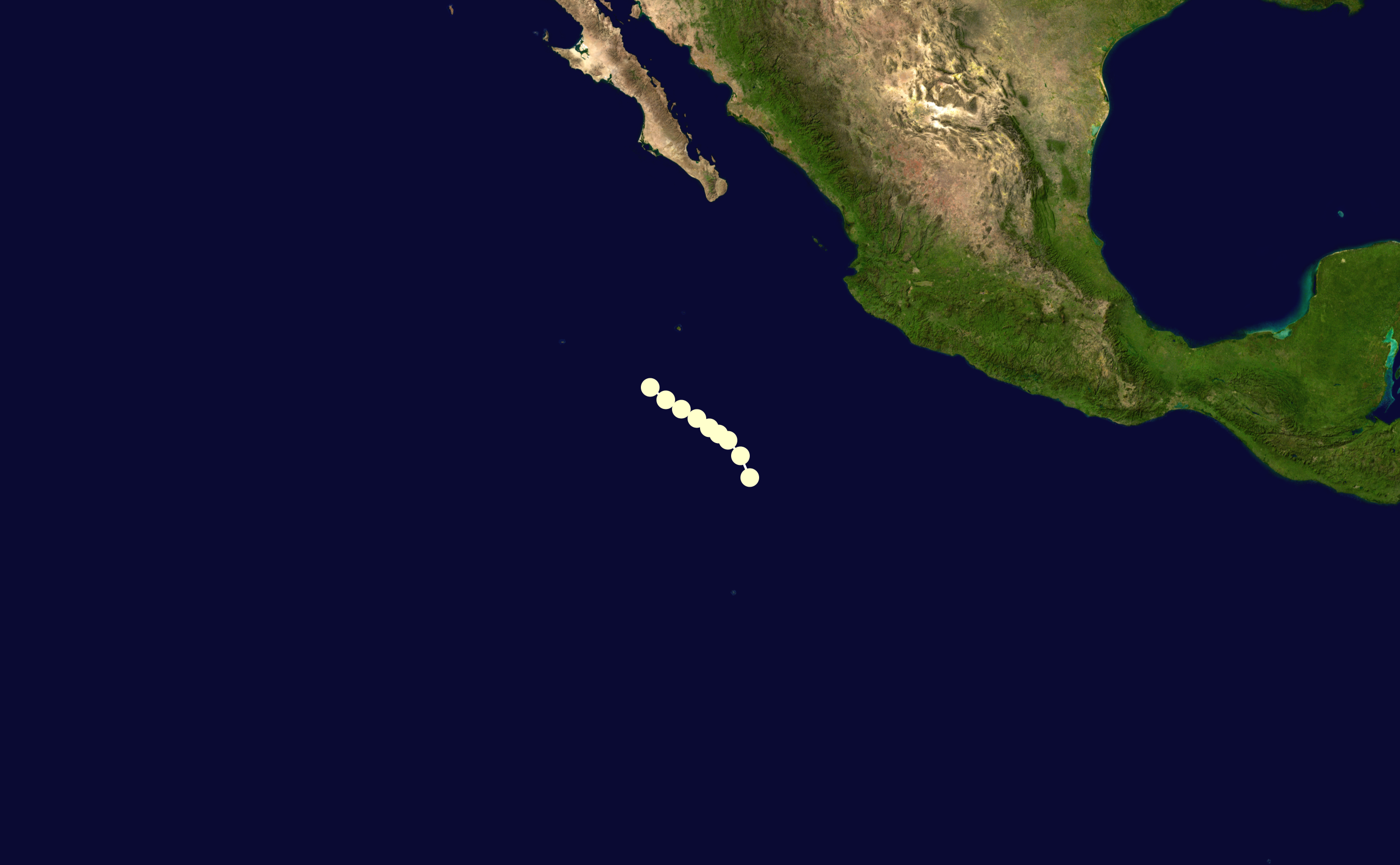
- Duration: October 1 – October 3
- Peak intensity: 85 mph (140 km/h) (1-min);

The final tropical cyclone of the season was initially discovered 539 mi (867.43 km) southwest of Zihuatanejo, Mexico. Hurricane Seven initially headed northward, but curved northwestward later that day. No change in intensity occurred, and Hurricane Seven dissipated on October 3, 142 mi (228.52 km) southwest of Socorro Island.

== See also ==
- List of Pacific hurricane records
- 1950 Atlantic hurricane season
- 1950 Pacific typhoon season
- 1950 North Indian Ocean cyclone season
- Australian region cyclone seasons: 1949–50 1950–51
- South Pacific cyclone seasons: 1949–50 1950–51
- South-West Indian Ocean cyclone seasons: 1949–50 1950–51
