= 1950s South Pacific cyclone seasons =

Seasonal boundaries
- First system formed: January 22, 1950
- Last system dissipated: January 4, 1960

Seasonal statistics
- Total disturbances: 120
- Total fatalities: 500+
- Total damage: Unknown

Related articles
- 1950s Australian region cyclone seasons; 1950s South-West Indian Ocean cyclone seasons

The following is a list of all reported tropical cyclones within the South Pacific Ocean to the east of 160°E during the 1950s decade.

== Systems ==
=== 1949–50 ===
- January 22 – 27, 1950 – A possible tropical cyclone existed to the north of New Caledonia.
- January 29 – February 6, 1950 – A tropical cyclone developed in between the Northern and Southern Cook Islands and passed to the south of the Samoan Islands. Moving westwards the system passed within 100 km (60 mi) of Niuatoputapu during January 31, before it passed near Niuafoou during February 1. The system then moved south-westwards through the Lau Islands during February 2, where it caused gale-force winds but no significant damage.
- February 20 – March 1, 1950 – During February 25, a tropical cyclone moved westwards through the Lau Islands and between Fiji's main islands of Viti Levu and Vanua Levu. The system subsequently turned south-southeastwards during the following day, while its movement slowed which caused prolonged heavy rainfall and flooding over Viti Levu and in the district of Labasa on Vanua Levu. Five deaths were associated with the system after a motorboat was lost while several other vessels encountered difficulties.
- March 6 – 13, 1950 – A tropical cyclone impacted Fiji.
- March 28 – April 2, 1950 – A tropical cyclone impacted Fiji.

=== 1950–51 ===
- December 31, 1950 - January 4, 1951 - A tropical cyclone impacted the Samoan Islands.
- February 23 – 26, 1951 – A tropical cyclone impacted the Solomon Islands.
- March 24 - April 1, 1951 – A tropical cyclone impacted the Solomon Islands.

=== 1951–52 ===
- December 19, 1951 - January 1, 1952 - A tropical cyclone impacted Vanuatu.
- January 22 - 27, 1952 - A tropical cyclone impacted Fiji and Tonga.
- January 23 - 30, 1952 - A tropical cyclone impacted the Solomon Islands and Fiji.
- February 1952 - A tropical cyclone impacted the Solomon Islands.
- March 3 - 12, 1952 - A tropical cyclone impacted New Caledonia.
- April 1 - 6, 1952 - A tropical cyclone impacted Vanuatu.

=== 1952–53 ===
- November 30, 1952 - A tropical cyclone impacted Vanuatu.
- March 1 - 9, 1953 - A tropical cyclone impacted the Solomon Islands and New Caledonia.
- March 1 - 6, 1953 - A tropical cyclone occurred to the east of Vanuatu.

=== 1953–54 ===
- December 1953 - A tropical cyclone impacted the Solomon Islands.
- January 4 - 8, 1954 - A tropical cyclone moved south-southeastwards between Queensland and New Caledonia.
- January 11 - 19, 1954 - A tropical cyclone impacted Fiji and Tonga.
- January 27 - 30, 1954 - A tropical cyclone impacted New Caledonia.
- February 13 - 20, 1954 - A tropical cyclone impacted Samoa, Tuvalu and Southern Vanuatu.
- March 2 - 7, 1954 - A tropical cyclone impacted New Caledonia and New Zealand.
- March 11 - 14, 1954 - A tropical cyclone impacted Vanuatu.
- April 22 - 25, 1954 - A tropical cyclone impacted Fiji.

=== 1954–55 ===
- January 2 - 3, 1955 - A tropical cyclone impacted Niue and the Southern Cook Islands.
- January 2 - 13, 1955 - A tropical cyclone impacted Vanuatu and Fiji.
- January 4 - 13, 1955 - A tropical cyclone impacted French Polynesia.
- January 25 - 29, 1955 - A tropical cyclone impacted the Solomon Islands, Fiji and southern Tonga.
- February 26 - March 7, 1955 - A tropical cyclone impacted Vanuatu and New Caledonia.
- March 6 - 10, 1955 - A tropical cyclone impacted Fiji.
- March 23 - April 6, 1955 - A tropical cyclone impacted the Solomon Islands and New Caledonia.
- April 10 - 16, 1955 - A tropical cyclone impacted New Caledonia.

=== 1955–56 ===
- December 25, 1955 - January 1, 1956 - A tropical cyclone impacted New Caledonia.
- January 1 – 5, 1956 – A tropical cyclone impacted Tonga, Niue and the Southern Cook Islands.
- January 21 – 28, 1956 – A tropical cyclone impacted Willis Island before moving erratically south-eastwards and southwards along 160°E towards Lord Howe Island.
- January 21 - 24, 1956 – A tropical cyclone impacted New Caledonia.
- January 29 - February 3, 1956 - A tropical cyclone impacted Fiji.
- February 16 - 19, 1956 - A tropical cyclone impacted Fiji, Tonga and Niue.
- February 24 - March 6, 1956 - A tropical cyclone Fiji, Vanuatu and New Caledonia.
- March 4 - 9, 1956 - A tropical cyclone impacted Fiji.
- March 12 - 17, 1956 - A tropical cyclone impacted Vanuatu.
- March 13 - 17, 1956 - A tropical cyclone existed near Samoa.
- April 3 - 7, 1956 - A tropical cyclone impacted New Caledonia.
- April 6 - 9, 1956 - A tropical cyclone impacted New Caledonia.

=== 1956–57 ===
- November 14 – 20, 1956 – A tropical cyclone impacted Vanuatu.
- December 22 – 24, 1956 – A tropical cyclone passed to the south of New Caledonia.
- January 4 – 10, 1957 – A tropical cyclone developed over the Coral Sea during January 4, before it moved over New Caledonia during January 6.
- January 11 – 16, 1957 – A possible tropical cyclone developed near New Caledonia to the south of Fiji.
- February 4 – 9, 1957 – A tropical cyclone impacted Niue and the Samoan Islands.
- February 4 – 18, 1957 – A tropical cyclone moved erratically near Wallis and Futuna, before it turned southwards to the west of New Caledonia.
- February 12 – 13, 1957 – A tropical cyclone existed to the west of Fiji and caused gales in the Yasawa Islands, but did not make landfall on Fiji.
- February 22 – March 1, 1957 – A tropical cyclone passed near to the island of Futuna before it impacted Fiji.
- March 6, 1957 – A tropical cyclone impacted New Caledonia.
- March 28 – April 1, 1957 – A tropical cyclone was located to the north of New Caledonia and moved south-eastwards between Vanuatu and the Loyalty Islands.

=== 1957–58 ===
- November 8 – 17, 1957 – A tropical cyclone impacted Tuvalu and Fiji.
- December 4 – 9, 1957 – A tropical cyclone impacted Tokelau, Wallis and Futuna as well as Tonga.
- January 1 – 9, 1958 – A tropical cyclone impacted Tokelau, Wallis and Futuna as well as Fiji.
- January 17 – 21, 1958 – A tropical cyclone impacted French Polynesia's Society and Austral Islands.
- February 16, 1958 - A tropical cyclone impacted Niue.
- February 17, 1958 – A tropical cyclone impacted the Northern Cook Islands.
- March 12 – 17, 1958 – A tropical cyclone developed to the north-west of Rotuma and passed to the west of Fiji, where it caused gales in the Yasawa Islands, but did not make landfall on Fiji.
- April 7 – 10, 1958 – A tropical cyclone impacted Fiji and Rotuma.

=== 1958–59 ===
- October 1958 – A tropical cyclone impacted the Solomon Islands.
- November 28 – December 6, 1958 – Tropical Cyclone Aurelia.
- December 1958 – A tropical cyclone impacted the Santa Cruz Islands of the Solomon Islands.
- January 2 – 3, 1959 – A tropical cyclone moved south – eastwards between the Southern Cook Islands of Aituaki and Rarotonga.
- January 15 – 21, 1959 – Tropical Cyclone Beatrice.
- January 24 – 28, 1959 – Tropical Cyclone Dorothee.
- January 27 – 30, 1959 – A tropical cyclone impacted French Polynesia's Society and Austral Islands.
- February 11 – 16, 1959 – Tropical Cyclone Eulalie.
- February 14 – 17, 1959 – Tropical Cyclone Gabrielle.
- February 23 – March 2, 1959 – Tropical Cyclone Honorine.
- March 7 – 14, 1959 – Tropical Cyclone Ida.

=== 1959–60 ===
- December 20 – 31, 1959 – Tropical Cyclone Amanda.
- December 28, 1959 – January 4, 1960 – Tropical Cyclone Brigette.

== See also ==
- South Pacific tropical cyclone
- Atlantic hurricane seasons: 1950, 1951, 1952, 1953, 1954, 1955, 1956, 1957, 1958, 1959
- Pacific hurricane seasons: 1950, 1951, 1952, 1953, 1954, 1955, 1956, 1957, 1958, 1959
- Pacific typhoon seasons: 1950, 1951, 1952, 1953, 1954, 1955, 1956, 1957, 1958, 1959
- North Indian Ocean cyclone seasons: 1950, 1951, 1952, 1953, 1954, 1955, 1956, 1957, 1958, 1959
