= 1950s South-West Indian Ocean cyclone seasons =

Cyclone season in the Southwest Indian Ocean

The following is a list of South-West Indian Ocean tropical cyclones in the 1950s decade, before the 1959–60 season.

== Storms ==
=== February 1950 Mozambique Channel cyclone ===
A cyclone was first observed northeast of Madagascar on February 9. The storm moved west-southwestwards, crossing northern Madagascar on February 13. The storm moved across the Mozambique Channel and struck eastern Mozambique on February 15. The circulation moved inland across much of Africa, eventually reaching northern Namibia (then known as South-West Africa).

=== April 1952 Tanzania cyclone ===
On April 13, 1952, a tropical cyclone was first observed north of the Comoros. The cyclone moved west-southwestwards towards the coast of Africa at a low latitude. On April 15, the ship M.V. Tayari encountered the eye of the cyclone and observed a minimum pressure of 958 mbar (28.3 inHg). Later that day, the cyclone moved ashore in southeastern Tanzania near Lindi, where maximum sustained winds were estimated at 180 km/h (110 mph); this made the cyclone the strongest on record to strike the country. The storm weakened over land and turned southwestwards, moving into northern Mozambique. The cyclone left 34 fatalities in Tanzania. The HMEAS Rosalind assisted in delivering food, equipment, and soldiers to the region around Lindi.

=== January 1953 ===
A tropical cyclone originated northeast of the northern tip of Madagascar on January 8. It moved southwest at first before curving westwards, passing the outer islands of the Seychelles. The storm curved to the south and struck Mayotte, causing heavy damage in the capital city Dzaoudzi. Turning to the southeast, the cyclone moved ashore northwestern Madagascar near Mahajanga on January 13, where damage totaled over MF2 million (US$1 million) after three housing quarters were destroyed. Throughout Madagascar, 12 people died related to the cyclone. The storm continued southeastwards after moving ashore and later turned back to the southwest, dissipating on January 19.

=== Cyclone Astrid ===
Lasting from December 1957 until early in January 1958, Cyclone Astrid struck Mozambique and later produced torrential rainfall in northern South Africa, reaching over 500 mm (20 in).

=== March 1958 Mauritius cyclones ===
While returning home to the United Kingdom from a royal tour of Australia, Queen Elizabeth the Queen Mother landed in Mauritius on March 8, 1958, for a refueling. Cyclones in the area around Mauritius contributed to anxiety about Elizabeth landing safely. She would remain in Mauritius until March 11, 1958, experiencing violent electrical storms and pouring rain.

== See also ==
- South-West Indian Ocean tropical cyclone
- 1950s Australian region cyclone seasons
- 1950s South Pacific cyclone seasons
- Atlantic hurricane seasons: 1950, 1951, 1952, 1953, 1954, 1955, 1956, 1957, 1958, 1959
- Pacific hurricane seasons: 1950, 1951, 1952, 1953, 1954, 1955, 1956, 1957, 1958, 1959
- Pacific typhoon seasons: 1950, 1951, 1952, 1953, 1954, 1955, 1956, 1957, 1958, 1959
