= 1953 Pacific hurricane season =

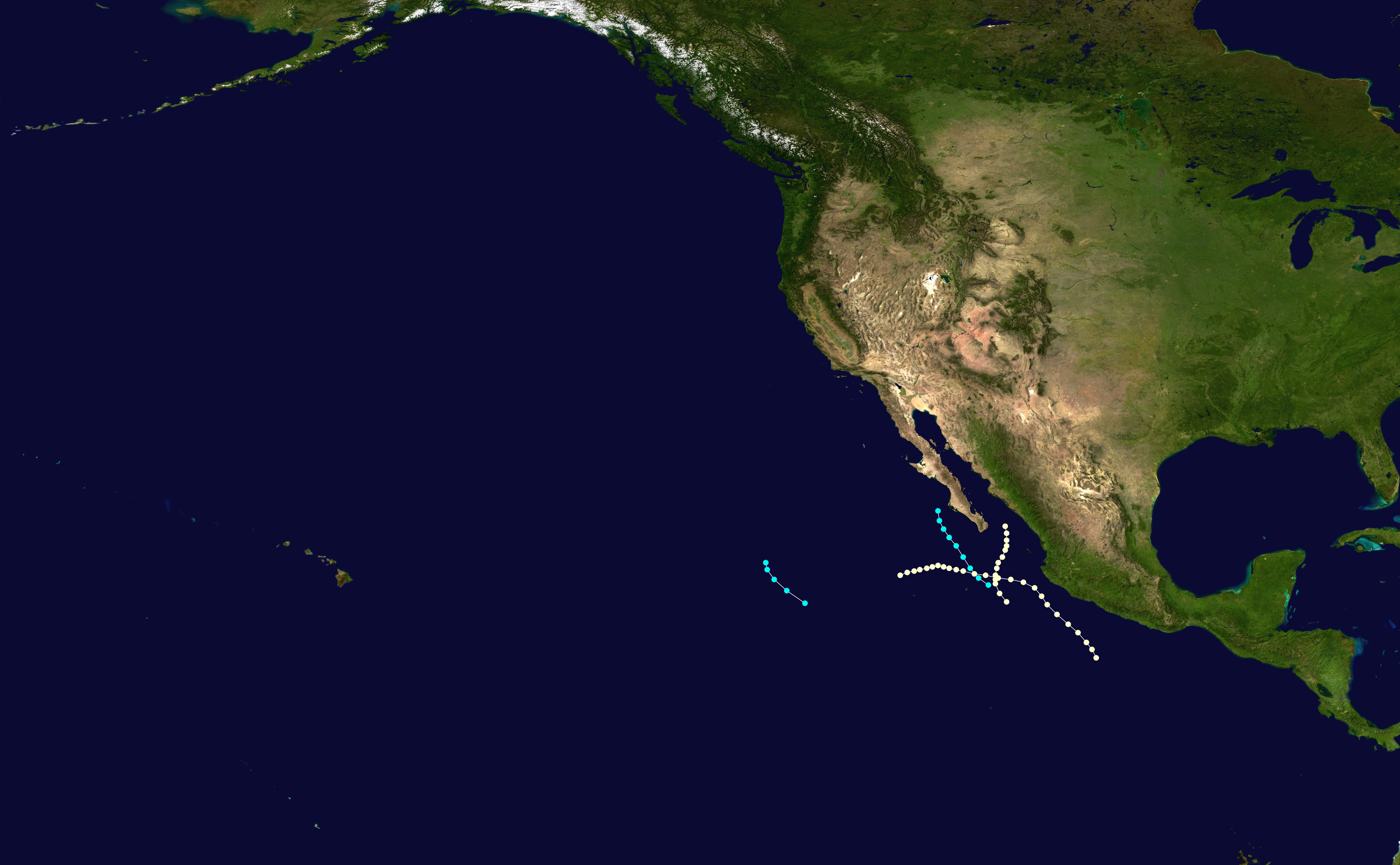
- Season summary map

Seasonal boundaries
- First system formed: August 23, 1953
- Last system dissipated: October 8, 1953

Strongest storm
- By maximum sustained winds: Four
  - Maximum winds: 90 mph (145 km/h) (1-minute sustained)
  - Lowest pressure: 991 mbar (hPa; 29.26 inHg)
- By central pressure: One
  - Maximum winds: 50 mph (85 km/h) (1-minute sustained)
  - Lowest pressure: 981 mbar (hPa; 28.97 inHg)

Seasonal statistics
- Total storms: 4 (record low)
- Hurricanes: 2
- Major hurricanes (Cat. 3+): 0
- Total fatalities: 0
- Total damage: None

Related articles
- 1953 Atlantic hurricane season; 1953 Pacific typhoon season; 1950s North Indian Ocean cyclone seasons

The 1953 Pacific hurricane season was the least active season on record. The season officially began on May 15 in the northeast Pacific Ocean and on June 1 in the central northern Pacific. They ended on November 30. These dates conventionally delimit the time of year when most tropical cyclones form in northeast Pacific Ocean. Before the satellite age started in the 1960s, data prior to that time on Pacific hurricanes is extremely unreliable as most east Pacific storms are of no threat to land.

Of the four known tropical systems, two became hurricanes. Although only a tropical storm, the first storm of the season was the deepest, with a pressure of 981 mbar (29.0 inHg). This season is unusual in that no one was killed, no damage was inflicted, and no tropical cyclones made landfall.

== Seasonal summary ==
Only four known systems were observed during the 1953 season. This was below the average at that time, which was six. Furthermore, the season was well below the 1949-2006 average of 13 named storms and had the fewest storms in the hurricane database. Only two tropical cyclones reached hurricane status, compared to the modern-day average of seven. Furthermore, 1953 is also one of the few seasons without a major hurricane. This season was part of a decade-long absence of major hurricanes; from 1950 to 1956, no major hurricanes (Category 3 or higher on the Saffir-Simpson Hurricane Wind Scale) were reported in the Eastern Pacific basin. However, it is possible that some storms were missed due to the lack of satellite coverage in the region in addition to the lack of Hurricane Hunter data, which did not become available until the following year.

The four known storms developed between the 14° N and the 20° N. All of the storms remained at sea throughout their lifetime; no deaths nor damages were noted during the season, though moisture from two of them reached the Southwestern United States. The season got onto an extremely slow start. The first storm formed in late August. At that time, it was believed that two systems would have long formed by then on average. According to the modern-day National Hurricane Center, 8-10 storms would have by that time on average. Additionally, 1953 had the latest start date of any Pacific hurricane season on record. Additionally, 1953 is the only season in the database to have no storms by August. Throughout the 1953 hurricane season, the Weather Bureau office in Los Angeles (WBOLA) issued 42 advisories during the season, mostly due to the storms' threat to Southern California.

In addition to the four storms in the dataset, according to the Joint Typhoon Warning Center and Japan Meteorological Agency, on October 22 Tropical Storm Alice crossed the International Dateline, entering into CPHC's area of responsibility. The storm eventually became extratropical on October 23 over open waters.

== Systems ==
=== Tropical Storm One ===
- Tropical storm (SSHWS)
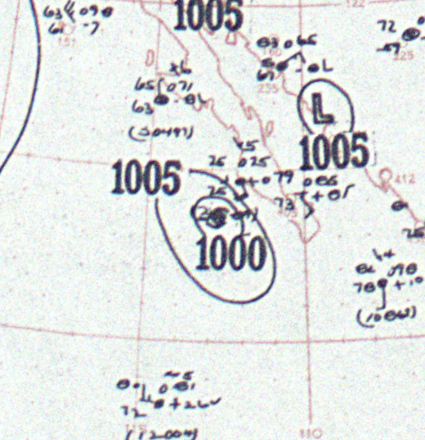
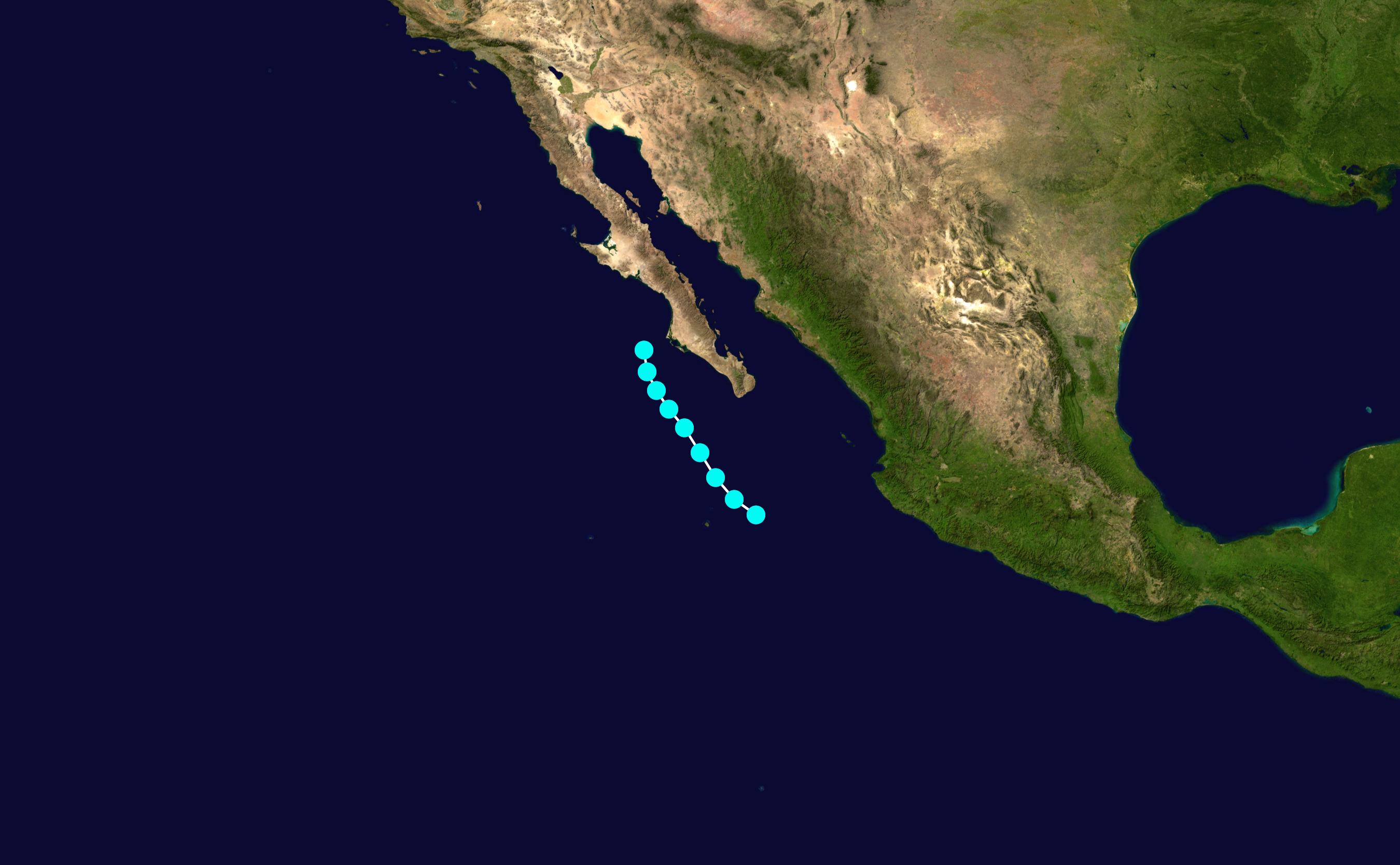
- Duration: August 23 – August 27
- Peak intensity: 50 mph (85 km/h) (1-min); 981 mbar (hPa)

Thunderstorm activity off the Mexican coast was quite for the first half of August. Based on data from six ships, a closed atmospheric circulation may have formed near the Revillagigedo Islands at 0000 UTC on August 23, which are situated roughly 350 mi (565 km) south of the Baja California Peninsula. At this time, winds were estimated to be no higher than 28 mph (45 km/h). After formation, One moved west-northwest and on August 25, the storm attained its peak intensity of 50 mph (80 km/h). Furthermore, the ship S.S. Sirocco measured a minimum barometric pressure of 981 mbar (29.0 inHg). Although the WBOLA reported that the storm dissipated that night near the peninsula, the HURDAT database suggests that the storm maintained peak intensity for another day, until August 27 when it dissipated.

The remnants of Tropical Storm One brought heavy rains to Arizona at the very end of the month. Rainfall peaked at 3.22 in (82 mm) in Williams, while two other weather stations reported more than 3 in (76 mm) of precipitation.

=== Tropical Storm Two ===
- Tropical storm (SSHWS)
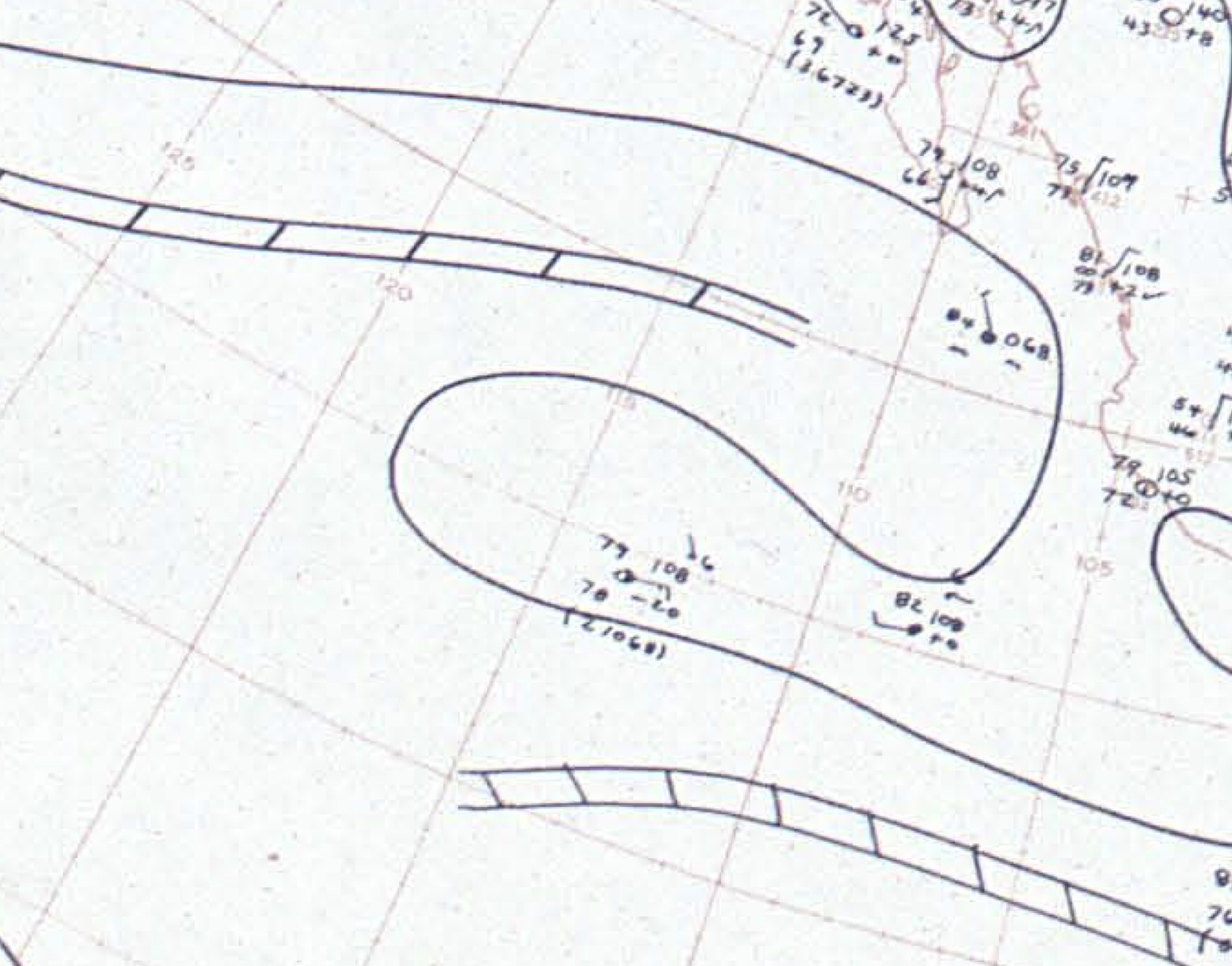
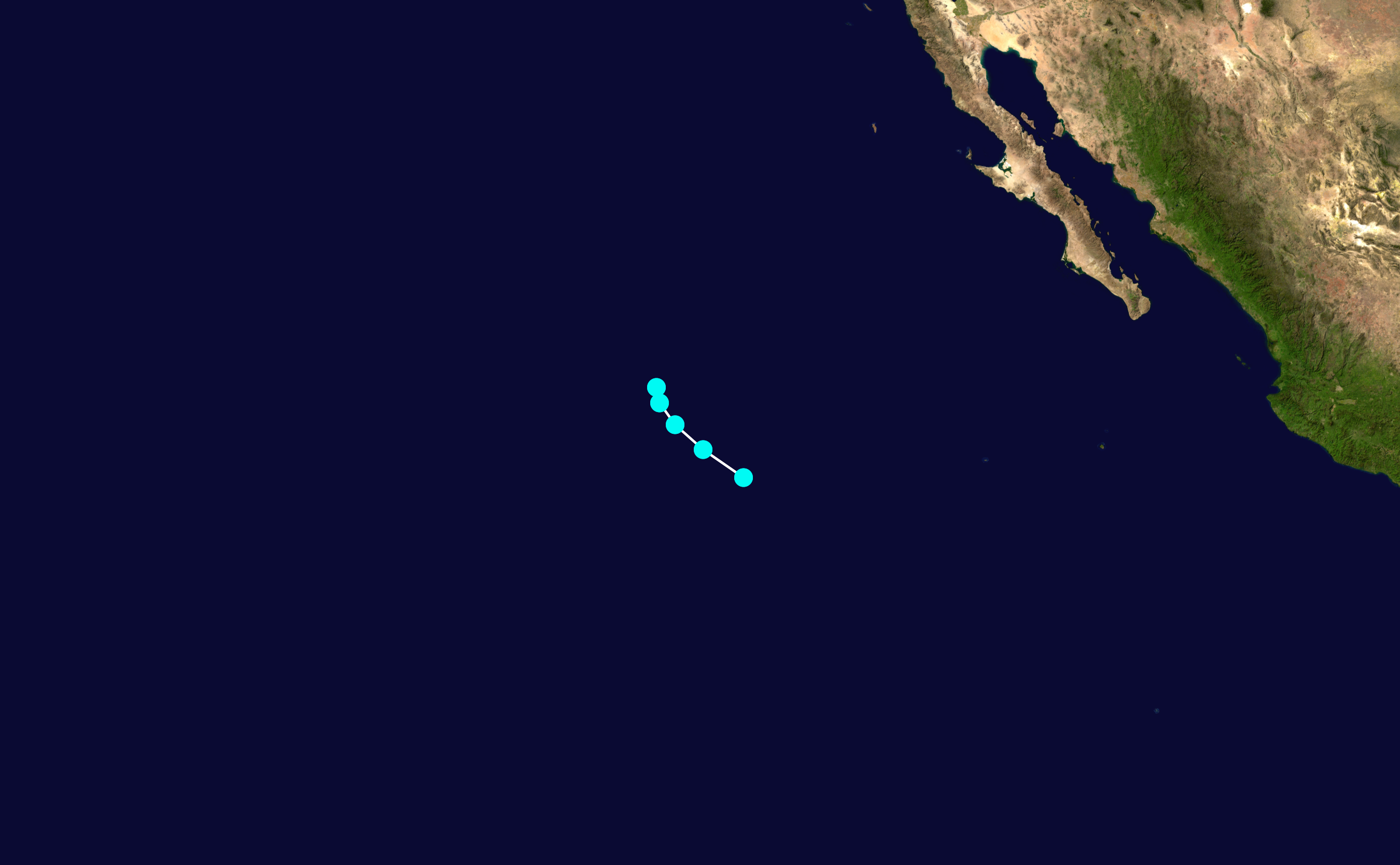
- Duration: September 9 – September 10
- Peak intensity: 50 mph (85 km/h) (1-min); 1001 mbar (hPa)

Ships reports from the Hawaiian Islands to Panama indicated that an area of disturbed weather formed just west of the Revillagigedo island group. Initially, evidence of closed wind circulation was insufficient to warrant an upgrade into a tropical disturbance. By the afternoon, pressures in the region began to fall. By that night, it was estimated to have developed winds of 40 mph (65 km/h). A tropical storm formed on September 9; meanwhile, ship reports indicated a pressure of 1,001 mbar (29.6 inHg) and sustained winds of 50 mph (85 km/h). Maintaining peak intensity for a day, the low moved northwest before dissipating on September 10 as barometric pressures began to rise. The remnants of the storm later brought rain to Central California on September 15.

=== Hurricane Three ===
- Category 1 hurricane (SSHWS)
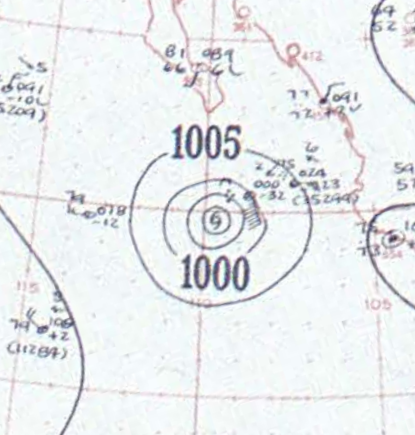
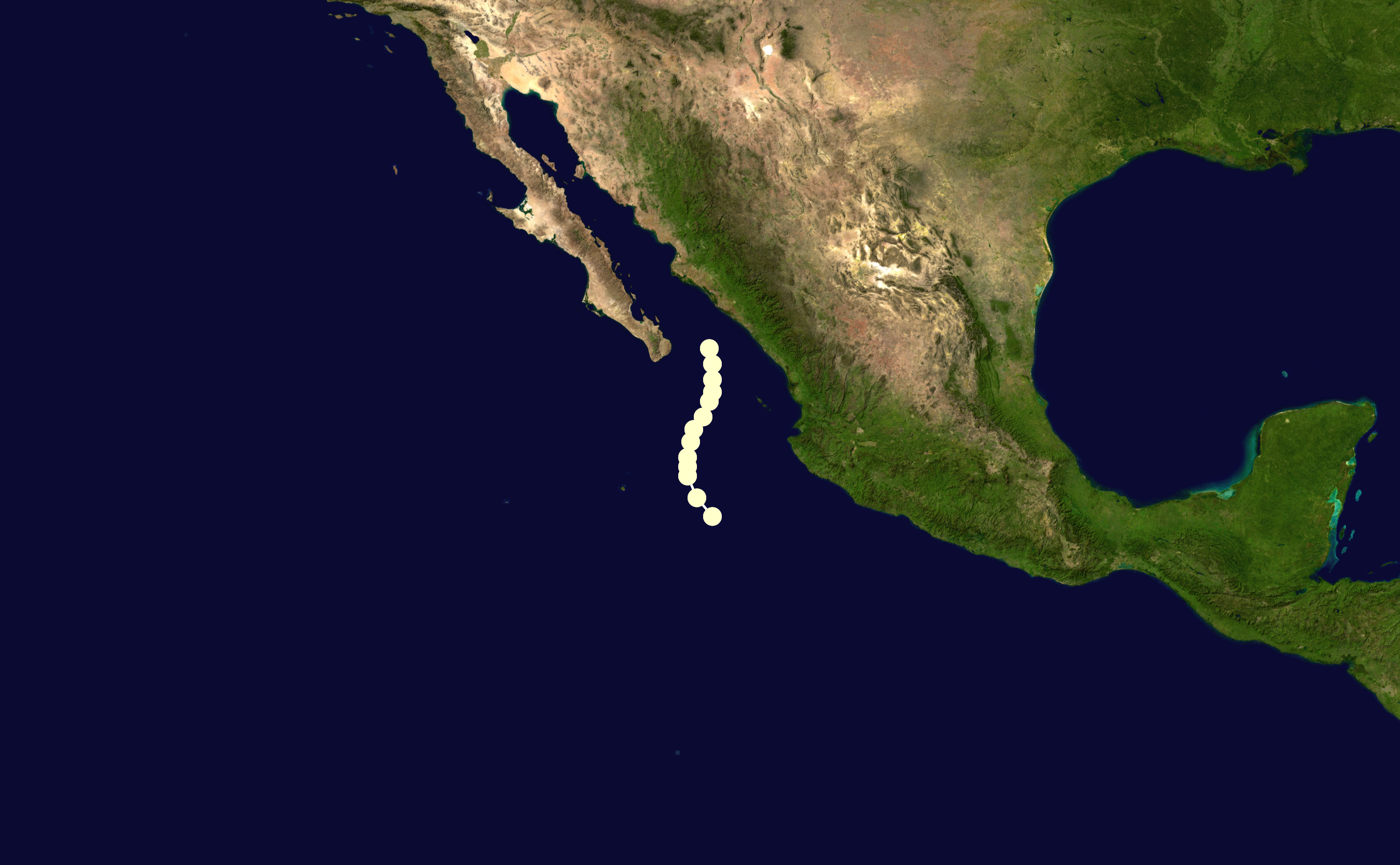
- Duration: September 13 – September 17
- Peak intensity: 85 mph (140 km/h) (1-min); 982 mbar (hPa)

A tropical cyclone first formed on September 13 near Western Mexico (in the extreme southern Gulf of California) while generating winds of 30–40 mph (50–65 km/h). It traveled north-northeastward and Three was upgraded into a hurricane on September 14 while reaching its maximum sustained wind speed of 85 mph (135 km/h). After turning east-northeast, Hurricane Three attained its peak pressure of 982 mbar (29.0 inHg). The storm held on to its wind speed, until September 17, when the storm dissipated. The remnants of the storm deluged the Mexican coast with rain, especially in Sinaloa. Winds of 45 mph (70 km/h) were reported in Mazatlan on land; however, no damage was recorded.

=== Hurricane Four ===
- Category 1 hurricane (SSHWS)
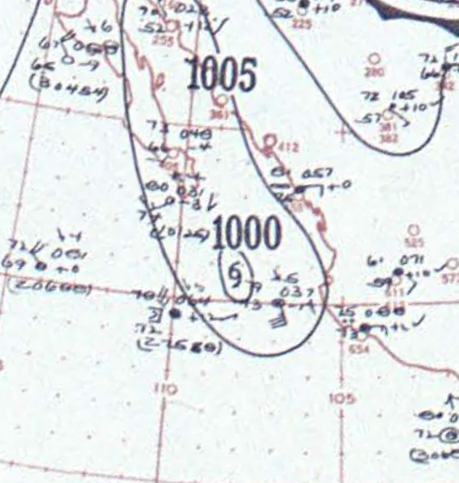
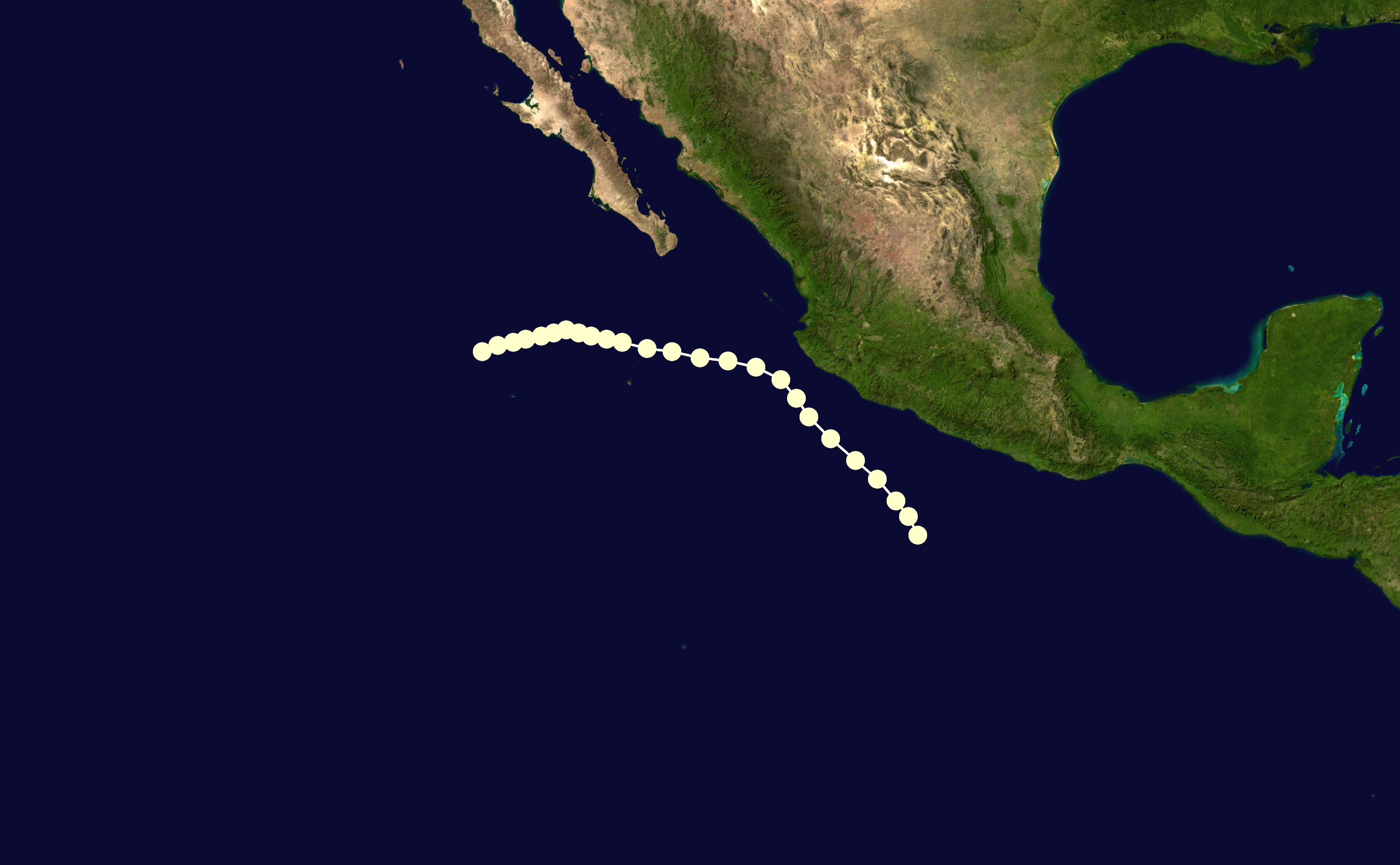
- Duration: October 1 – October 8
- Peak intensity: 90 mph (145 km/h) (1-min); 991 mbar (hPa)

On October 1, a closed low formed in the Gulf of Tehuantepec from an area of disturbed weather, which had persisted for several days prior. The next day, the hurricane database suggests that Four became a hurricane on October 2 while peaking in intensity, with winds of 85 mph (135 km/h). That day, a peak pressure of 991 mbar (29.3 inHg) was measured. The hurricane dissipated on October 8 later after holding on to its maximum wind speed for six days before finally dissipating nowhere near land.

== See also ==
- List of Pacific hurricanes
- Pacific hurricane season
- 1953 Atlantic hurricane season
- 1953 Pacific typhoon season
- Australian region cyclone seasons: 1952–53 1953–54
- South Pacific cyclone seasons: 1952–53 1953–54
- South-West Indian Ocean cyclone seasons: 1952–53 1953–54
