= 1953 Pacific typhoon season =

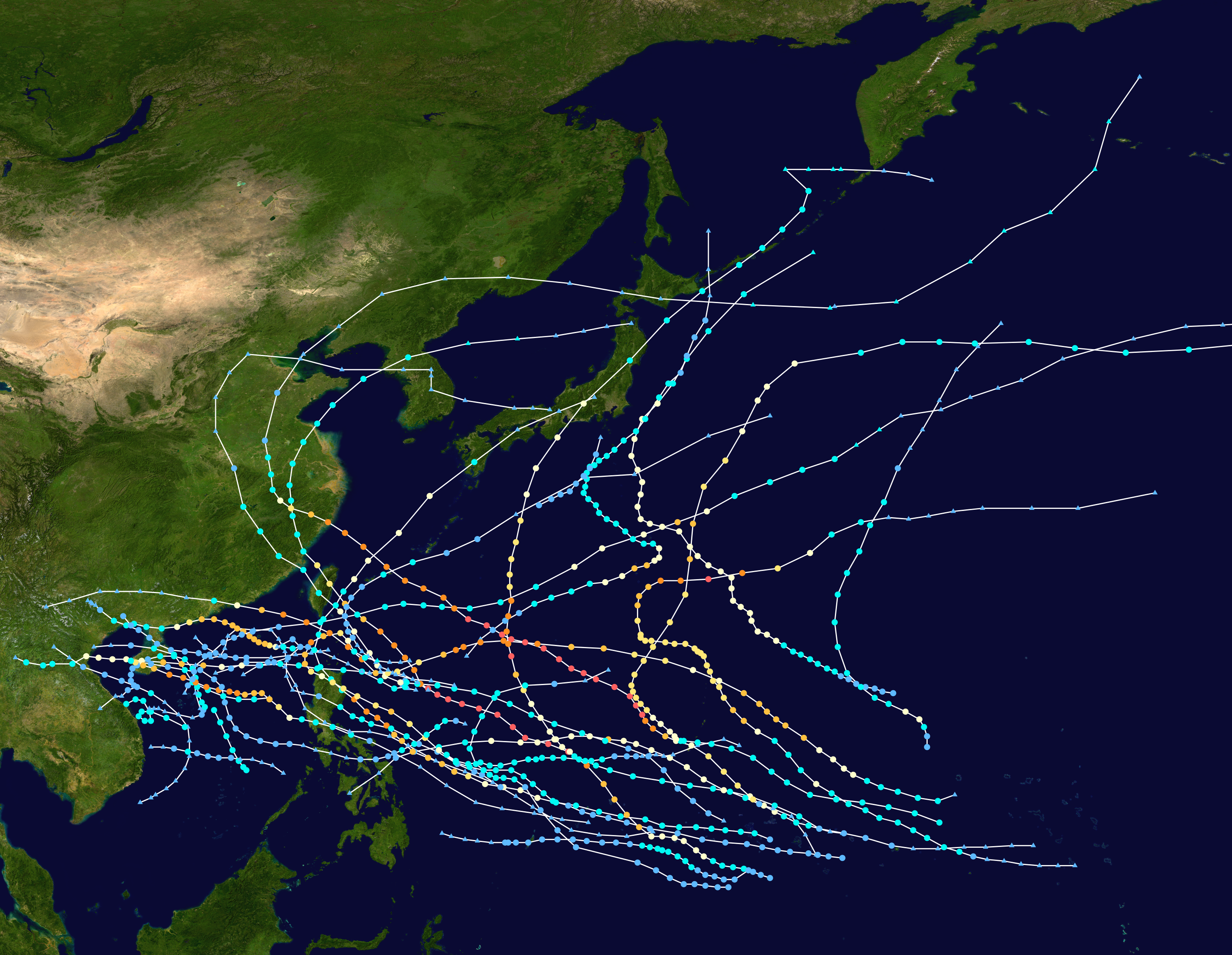
- Season summary map

Seasonal boundaries
- First system formed: February 18, 1953
- Last system dissipated: December 22, 1953

Strongest storm
- Name: Nina
  - Maximum winds: 295 km/h (185 mph) (1-minute sustained)
  - Lowest pressure: 885 hPa (mbar)

Seasonal statistics
- Total storms: 24
- Typhoons: 17
- Very strong typhoons: 5 (unofficial)
- Total fatalities: 430
- Total damage: Unknown

Related articles
- 1953 Atlantic hurricane season; 1953 Pacific hurricane season; 1950s North Indian Ocean cyclone seasons

The 1953 Pacific typhoon season has no official bounds; it ran year-round in 1953, but most tropical cyclones tend to form in the northwestern Pacific Ocean between June and December. These dates conventionally delimit the period of each year when most tropical cyclones form in the northwestern Pacific Ocean.

The scope of this article is limited to the Pacific Ocean, north of the equator and west of the International Date Line. Storms that form east of the date line and north of the equator are called hurricanes; see 1953 Pacific hurricane season. Tropical Storms formed in the entire west Pacific basin were assigned a name by the Fleet Weather Center on Guam.

== Systems ==
24 tropical depressions formed this year in the Western Pacific. 17 storms reached typhoon intensity, and 5 reached super typhoon strength.

=== Typhoon Irma ===
- Typhoon (JMA)
- Category 3 typhoon (SSHWS)
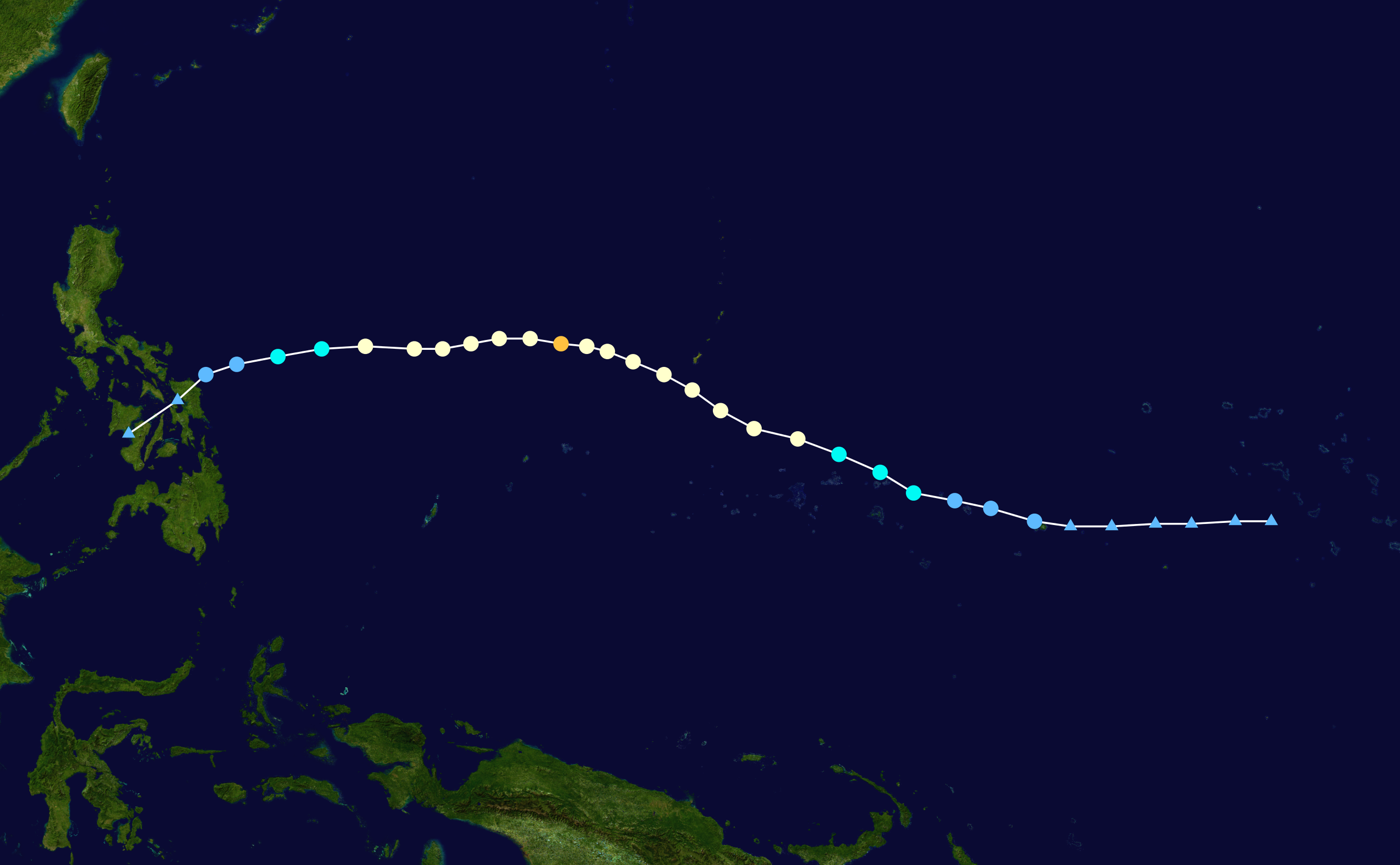
- Duration: February 18 – February 25
- Peak intensity: 185 km/h (115 mph) (1-min); 980 hPa (mbar)

Irma formed on February 18, just near the International Date Line. The storm moved west over the following days, slowly increasing its speed before reaching its peak intensity on February 23. The storm quickly lost speed, then made landfall over the Visayas archipelago of the Philippines. On February 25, the storm dissipated just near the province of Iloilo.

=== Typhoon Judy ===
- Typhoon (JMA)
- Category 4 typhoon (SSHWS)
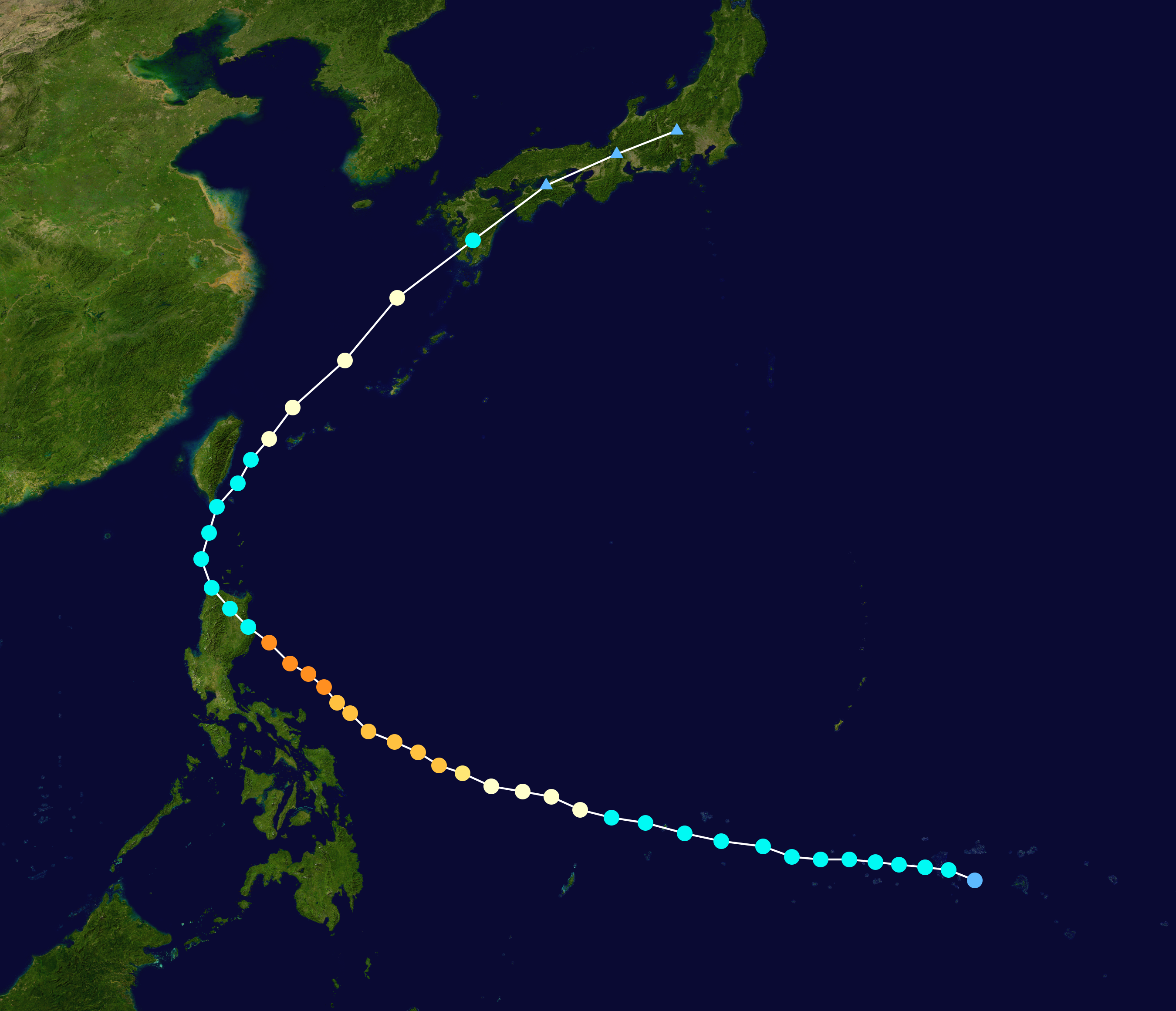
- Duration: May 28 – June 7
- Peak intensity: 220 km/h (140 mph) (1-min); 940 hPa (mbar)

Judy formed on May 28, to the east of the Philippines. The next day, the storm started moving west, then later moving northwest. Over the following days, the storm moved northwest, albeit curving. On June 4, the typhoon hit the Philippines, reaching its peak intensity in Luzon. The storm later curved north, skirting Taiwan. The storm started losing speed, then increased speed on June 6. The storm later curved north, directly hitting Japan. Later dissipating the next day. Judy damaged multiple areas in Japan, causing 37 deaths, 56 injuries, and leaving 17 people missing. The storm also destroyed 1802 houses, inundated another 33 thousand, and damaged 139 ships.

=== Tropical Storm 04W ===
- Tropical storm (JMA)
- Tropical storm (SSHWS)
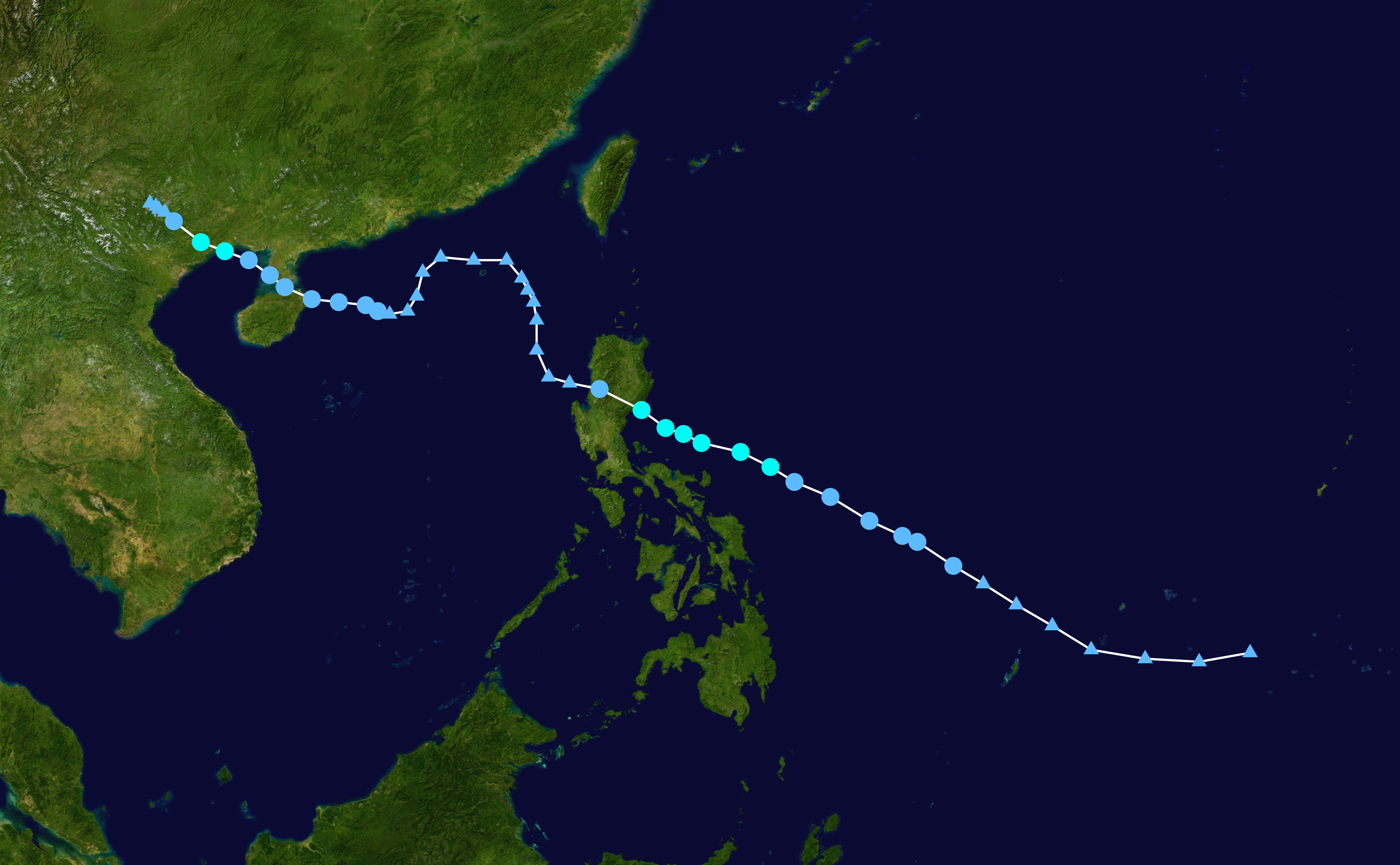
- Duration: June 21 – July 2
- Peak intensity: 75 km/h (45 mph) (1-min); 1000 hPa (mbar)

04W formed on June 21. The storm moved northwest, making landfall in the Philippines on June 25, reaching its peak intensity. On June 26, the storm quickly curved north and then quickly moved south the same day. A few days later, the storm made landfall in Hainan and later Mainland China.

=== Super Typhoon Kit ===
- Typhoon (JMA)
- Category 5 super typhoon (SSHWS)
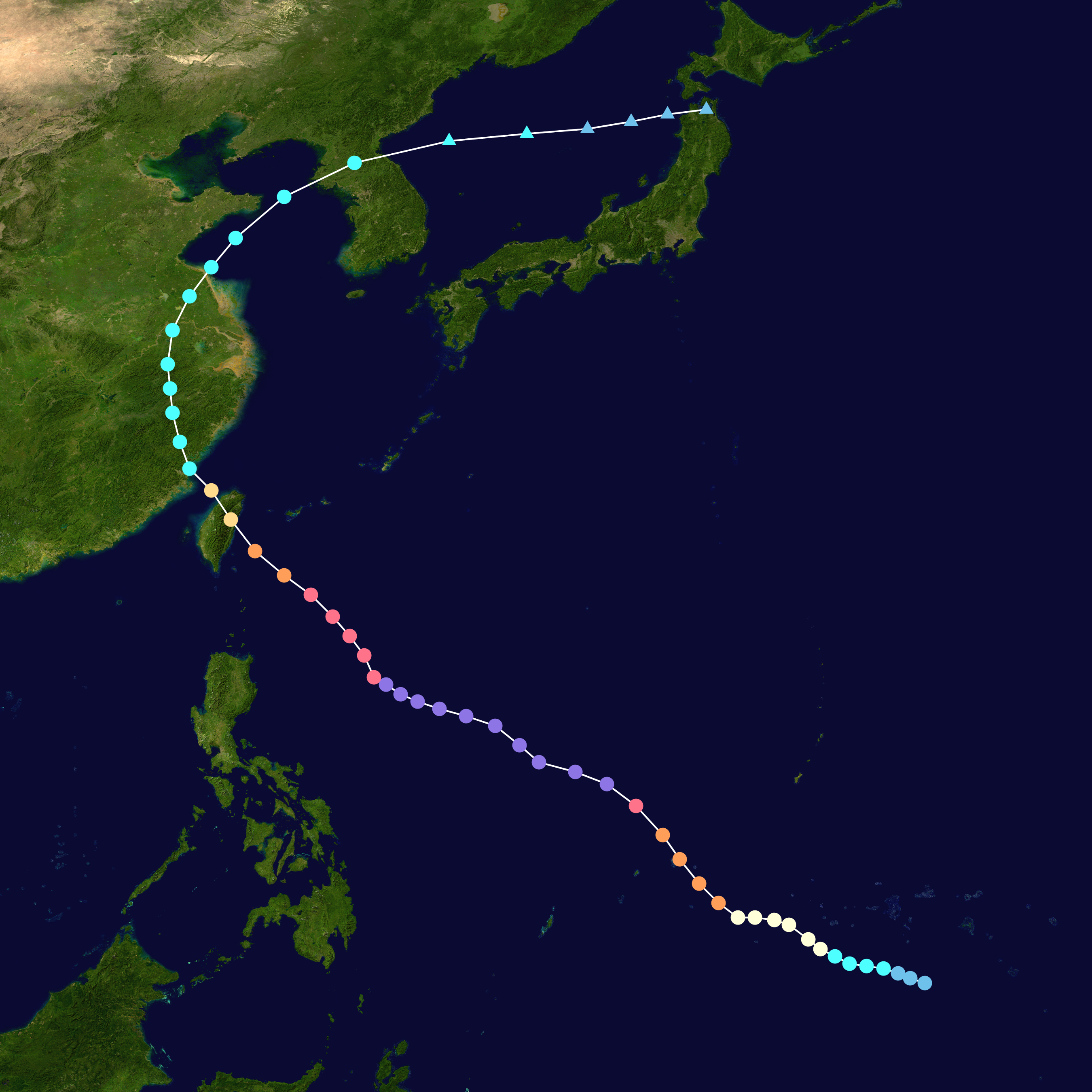
- Duration: June 25 – July 8
- Peak intensity: 280 km/h (175 mph) (1-min); 910 hPa (mbar)

On June 25, Kit formed just south of the Philippines. Over the following days, the storm traverses west, then later northwest, having peak intensity on June 29. Kit later starts decreasing speed on July 1, then made landfall in Taiwan on July 3. The next day, Kit settles in China, curving north. The storm stayed in China over the following days, then made landfall on the Korea peninsula on July 5. The storm later makes landfall in Japan on July 7, then dissipated the following day. Because of the storm, strong winds were recorded in Batanes, with widespread precipitation. Other than rain, Kit destroyed a ship and damaged another.

=== Typhoon Lola ===
- Typhoon (JMA)
- Category 1 typhoon (SSHWS)
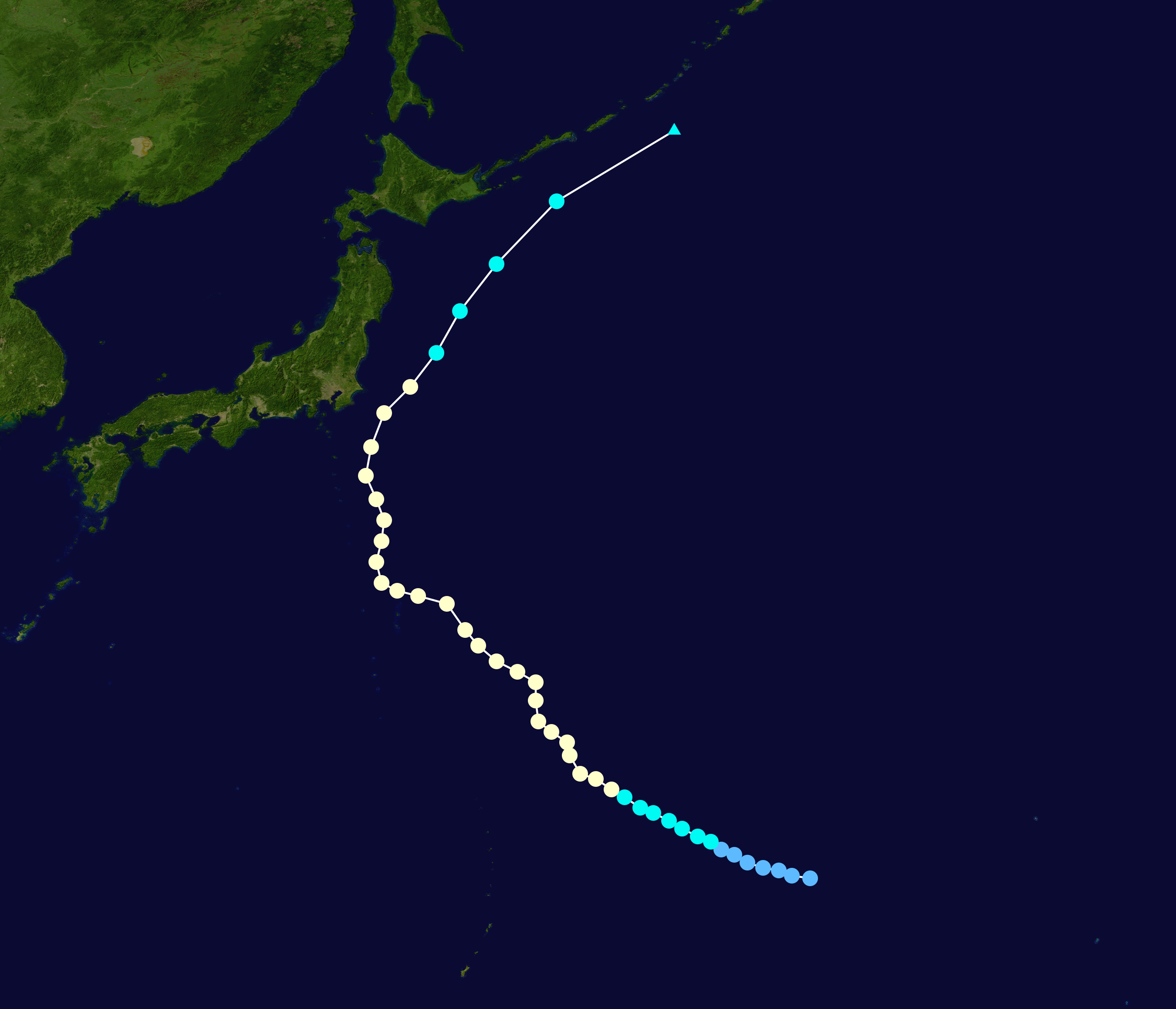
- Duration: July 23 – August 3
- Peak intensity: 150 km/h (90 mph) (1-min); 970 hPa (mbar)

On July 23, Lola spawned southeast of Japan. The typhoon curved northwest before differing between north and west. The storm then drifted north before curving northeast and dissipating shortly after on August 3.

=== Typhoon Mamie ===
- Typhoon (JMA)
- Category 3 typhoon (SSHWS)
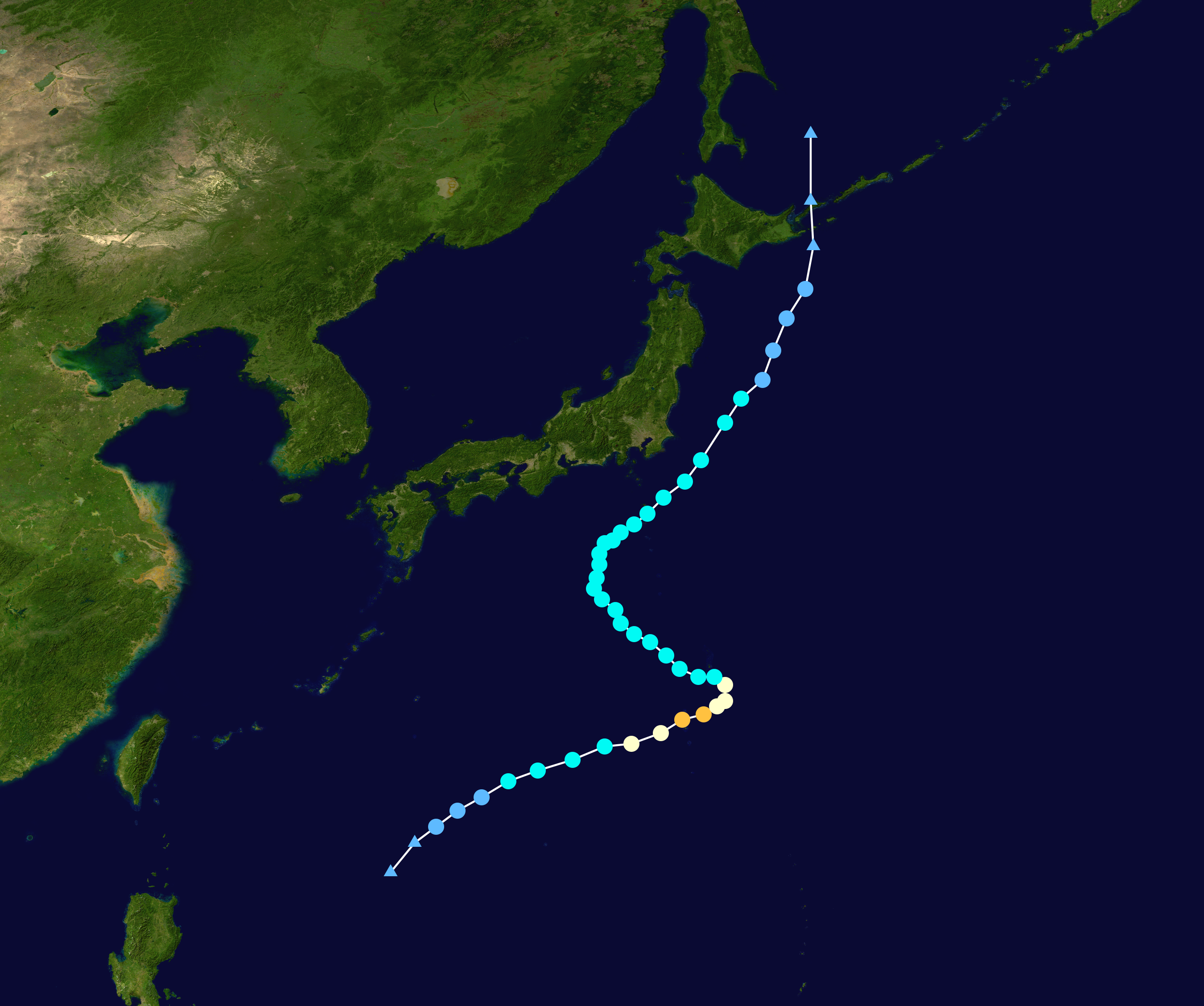
- Duration: July 30 – August 8
- Peak intensity: 185 km/h (115 mph) (1-min); 980 hPa (mbar)

Mamie formed east of the Philippines on July 30. It moved east and reached peak intensity on August 1.

=== Super Typhoon Nina ===
- Typhoon (JMA)
- Category 5 super typhoon (SSHWS)
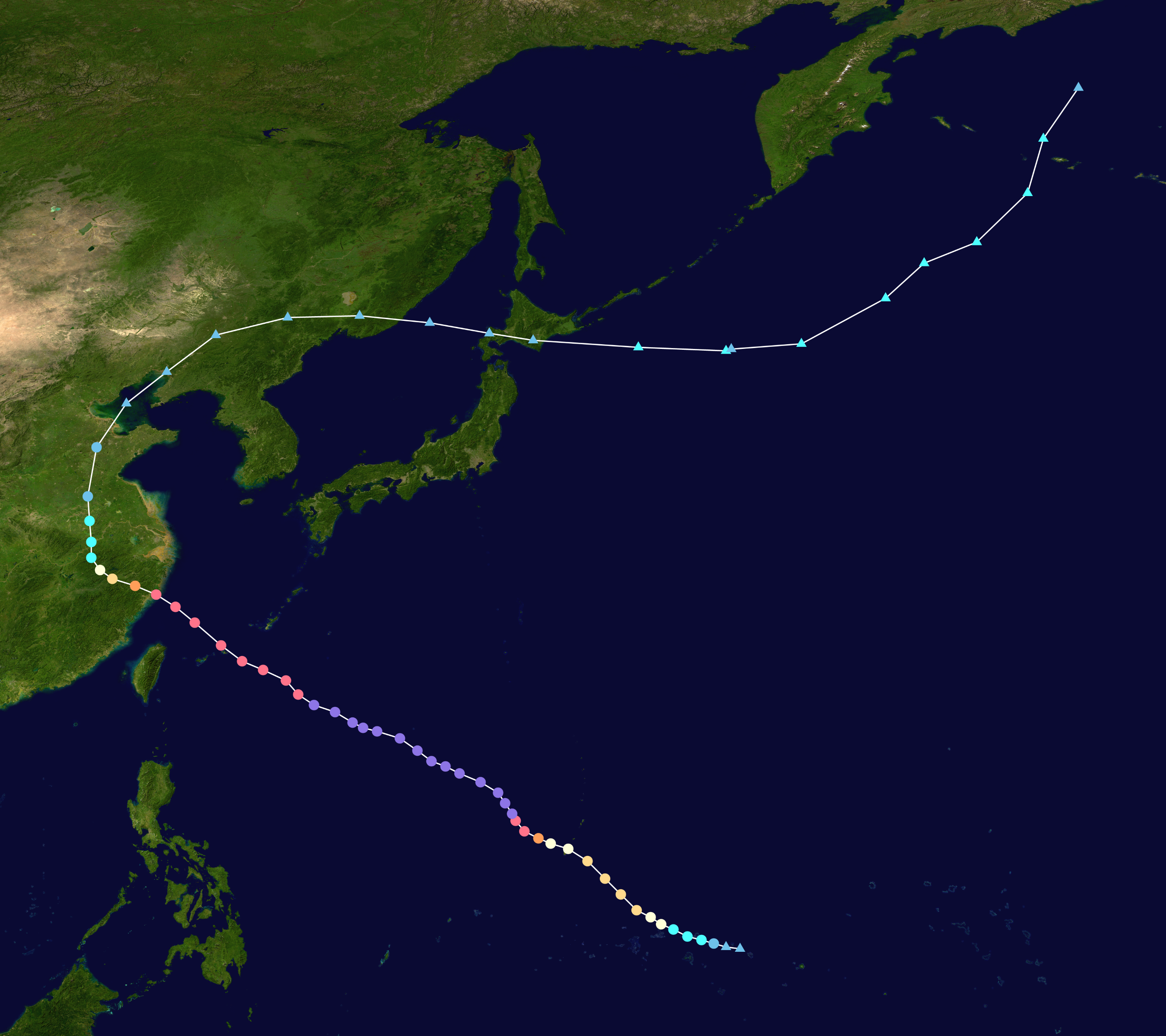
- Duration: August 8 – August 18
- Peak intensity: 295 km/h (185 mph) (1-min); 885 hPa (mbar)

Nina was a major storm. On August 8, Nina formed near Micronesia. Over the following days, the storm traveled northwest, reaching peak intensity on August 13. It later made landfall in China as a Category 4 tropical cyclone.

After landfall, Nina curved north. The storm turned into an extratropical cyclone, and made landfall in Japan on August 20.

=== Tropical Storm 09W ===
- Tropical depression (JMA)
- Tropical storm (SSHWS)
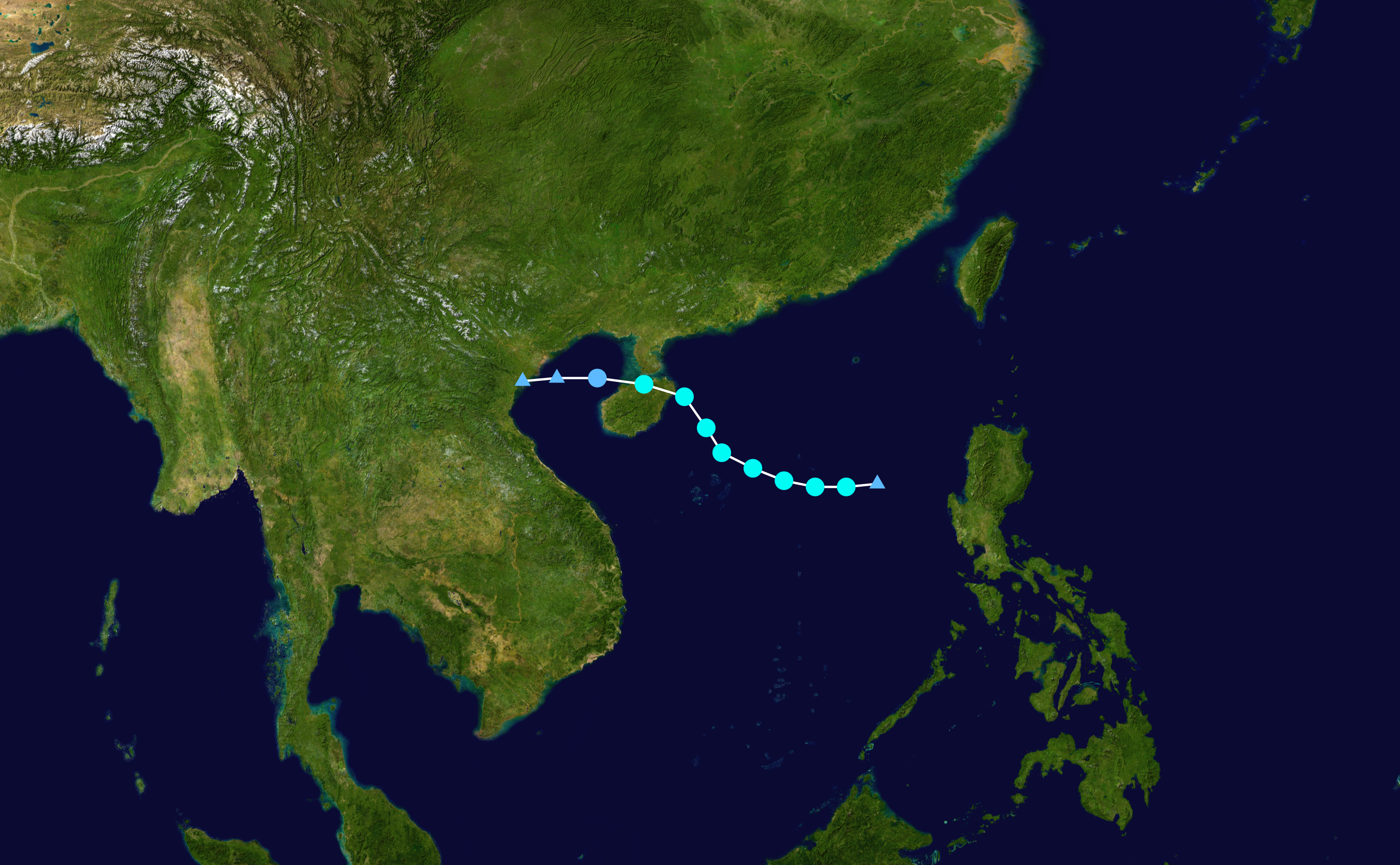
- Duration: August 9 – August 11
- Peak intensity: 85 km/h (50 mph) (1-min);

09W formed west of the Philippines on August 9. It traveled northwest, and hit China as a tropical storm on August 11.

=== Typhoon Ophelia ===
- Typhoon (JMA)
- Category 3 typhoon (SSHWS)
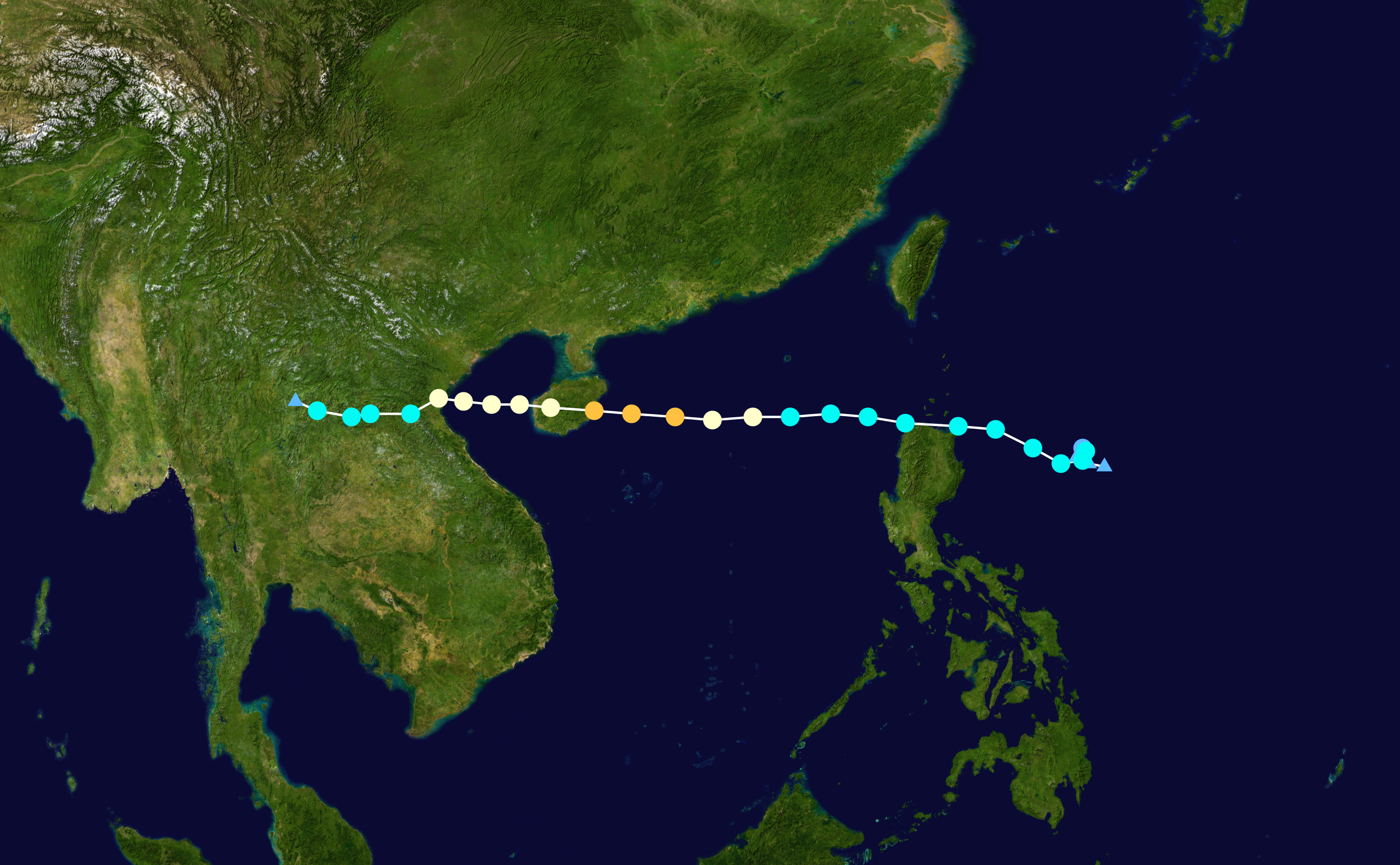
- Duration: August 12 – August 16
- Peak intensity: 185 km/h (115 mph) (1-min); 960 hPa (mbar)

Ophelia hit China and Vietnam.

=== Typhoon Phyllis ===
- Typhoon (JMA)
- Category 1 typhoon (SSHWS)
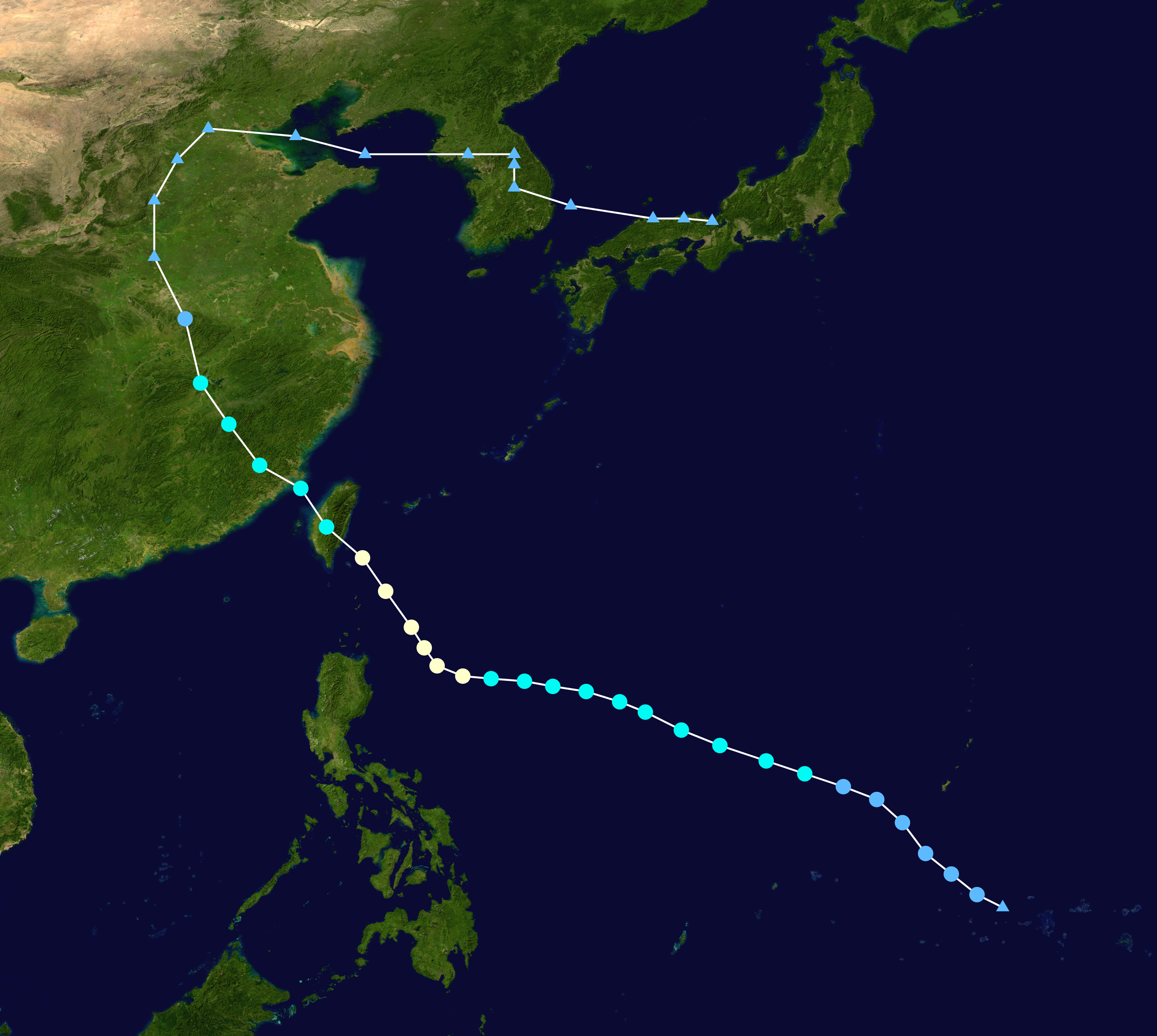
- Duration: August 15 – August 22
- Peak intensity: 140 km/h (85 mph) (1-min); 975 hPa (mbar)

Phyllis hit China as a tropical storm.

=== Typhoon Rita ===
- Typhoon (JMA)
- Category 4 typhoon (SSHWS)
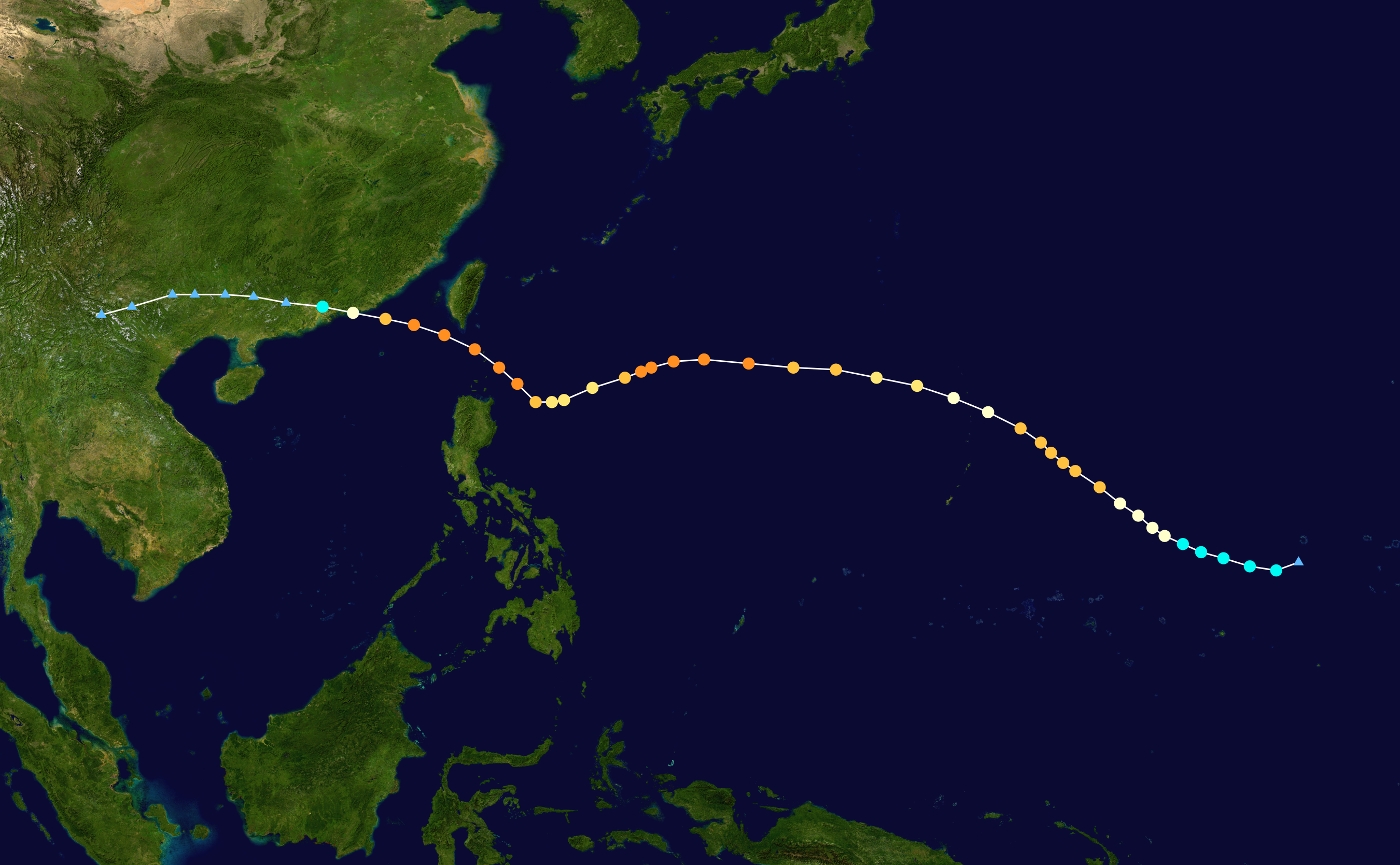
- Duration: August 23 – September 2
- Peak intensity: 230 km/h (145 mph) (1-min); 940 hPa (mbar)

Rita hit China as a tropical storm.

=== Tropical Storm 13W ===
- Tropical storm (JMA)
- Tropical storm (SSHWS)
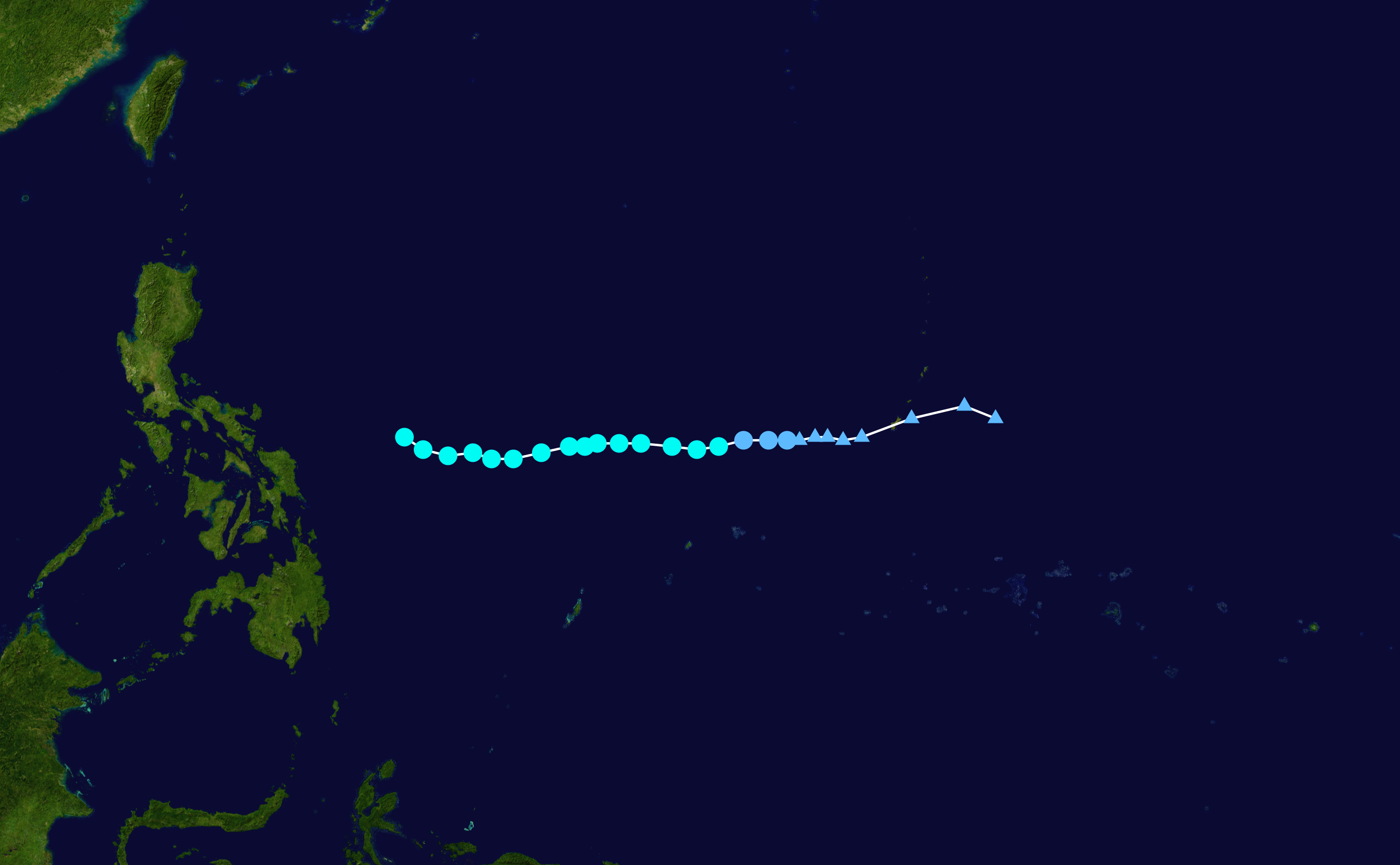
- Duration: August 26 – August 29
- Peak intensity: 100 km/h (65 mph) (1-min); 995 hPa (mbar)

13W existed from August 26 to August 29. It stayed out at sea without making landfall.

=== Typhoon Susan ===
- Typhoon (JMA)
- Category 3 typhoon (SSHWS)
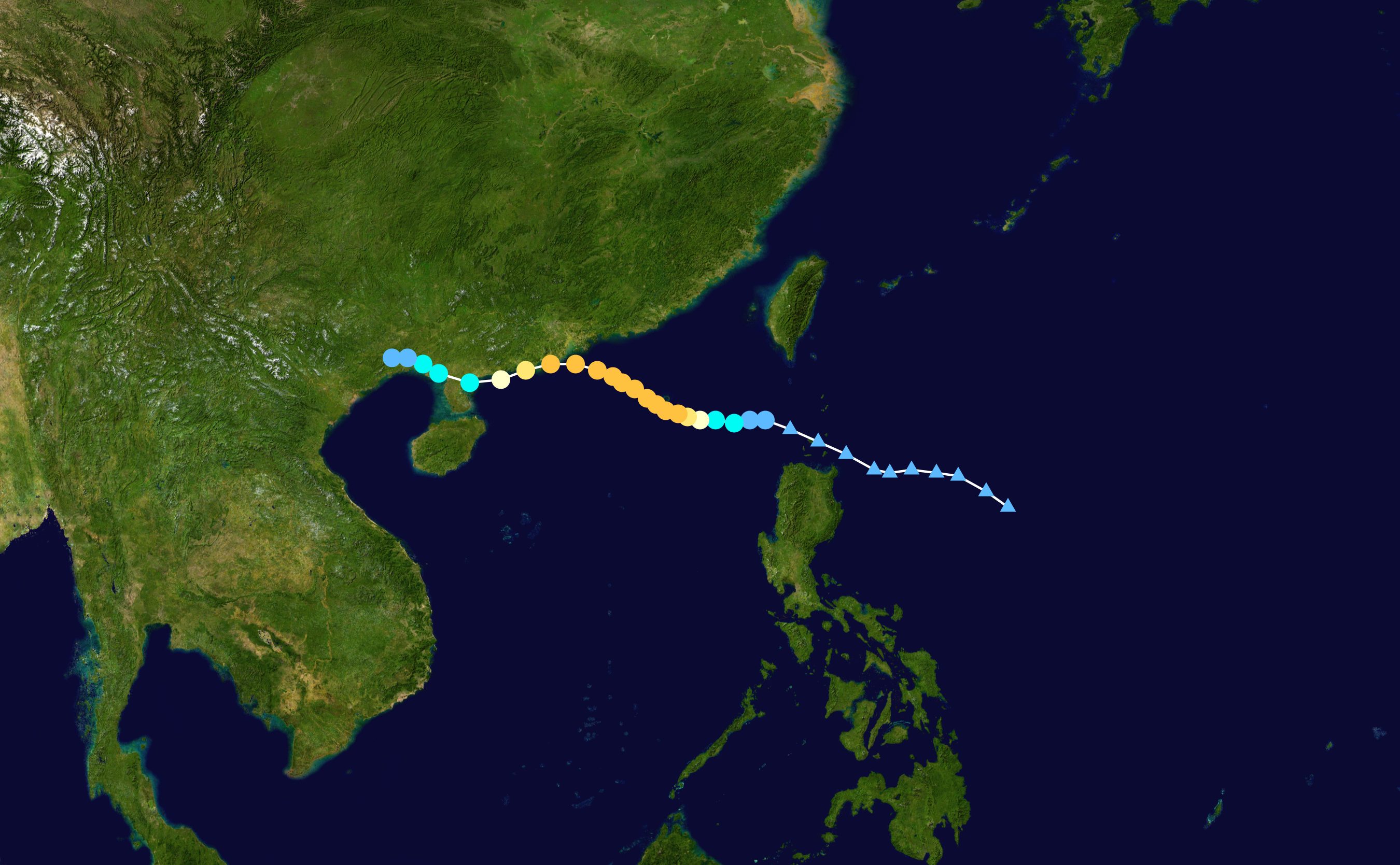
- Duration: September 15 – September 20
- Peak intensity: 205 km/h (125 mph) (1-min); 970 hPa (mbar)

Susan hit Hong Kong as a Category 3 typhoon.

=== Super Typhoon Tess ===
- Typhoon (JMA)
- Category 5 super typhoon (SSHWS)
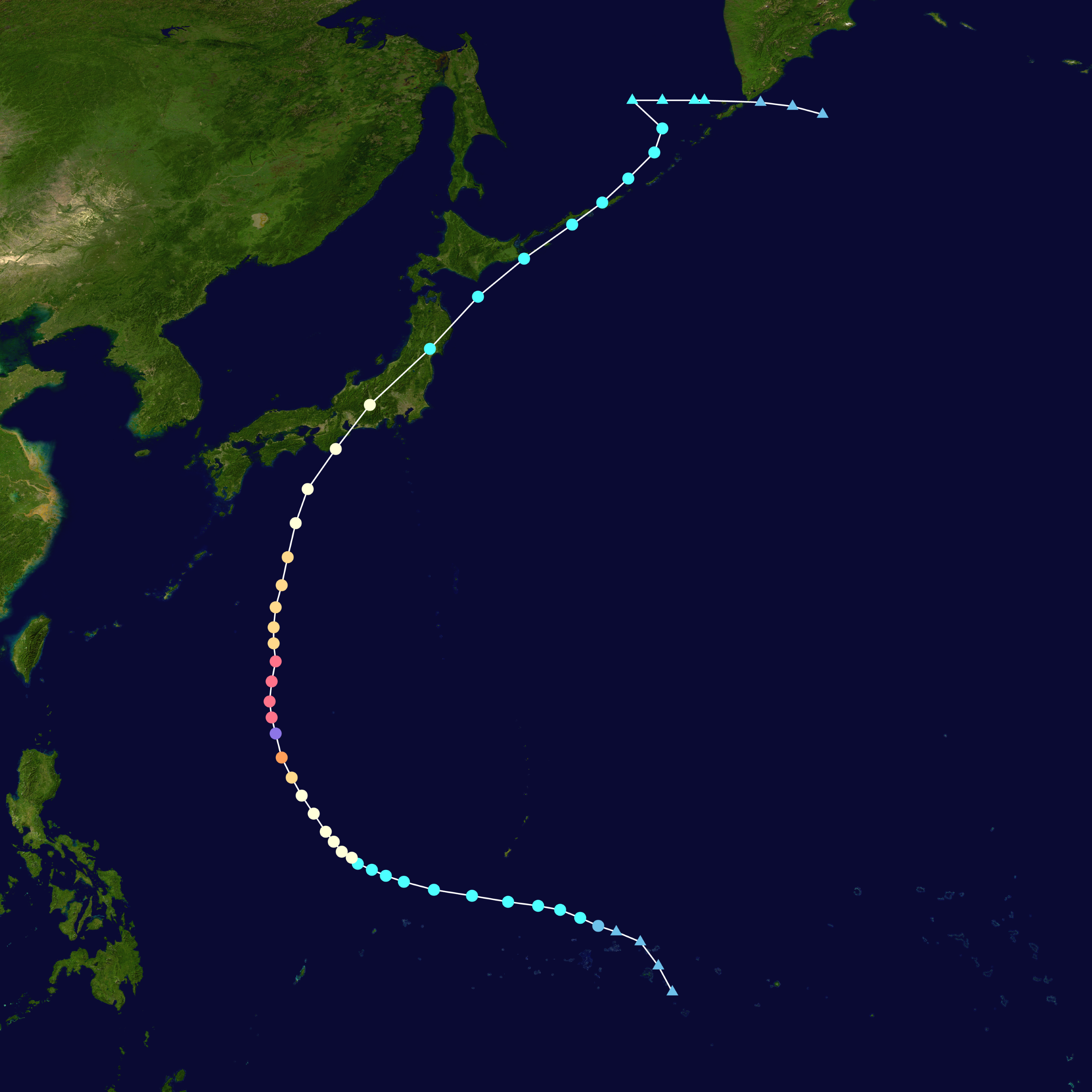
- Duration: September 17 – September 27
- Peak intensity: 280 km/h (175 mph) (1-min); 900 hPa (mbar)

Typhoon Tess formed in the eastern Caroline Islands on September 16. The cyclone moved northwest over the following days, remained relatively weak until around the September 21, but on the 22nd it strengthened rapidly, with a wind speed of 135 mph (217 km/h) recorded in the US.

The pressure of Typhoon Tess was 993 millibars (29.3 inHg) at 9:00 (JST) on the same day and dropped to 900mb at 15:00 JST. This pressure drop corresponds to the largest of Pacific typhoons since 1951. Over the following days, Tess weakened, moving northeast. Tess finally crossed the Shima Peninsula and made landfall to Aichi Prefecture on the September 25, then swerving at the last hour, barely missing Tokyo. The storm then weakened into an extratropical cyclone on September 27 and dissipated on September 29, just south of the Korean Peninsula. During the storm, 393 people were killed and 85 were missing.

=== Tropical Storm 16W ===
- Tropical storm (JMA)
- Tropical storm (SSHWS)
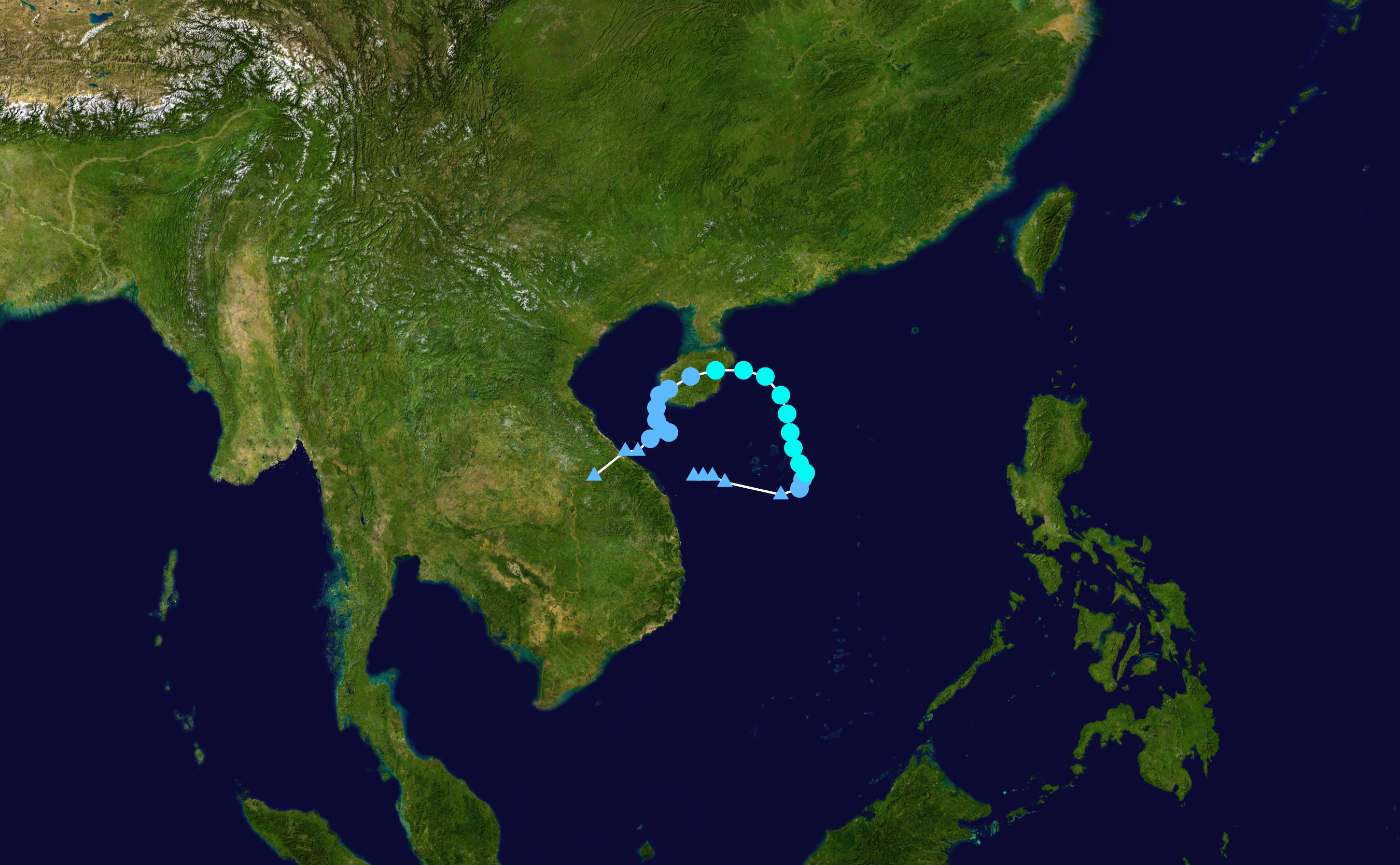
- Duration: September 25 – September 28
- Peak intensity: 75 km/h (45 mph) (1-min); 1000 hPa (mbar)

16W hit China as a tropical storm.

=== JMA Tropical Storm 15 ===
- Tropical storm (JMA)
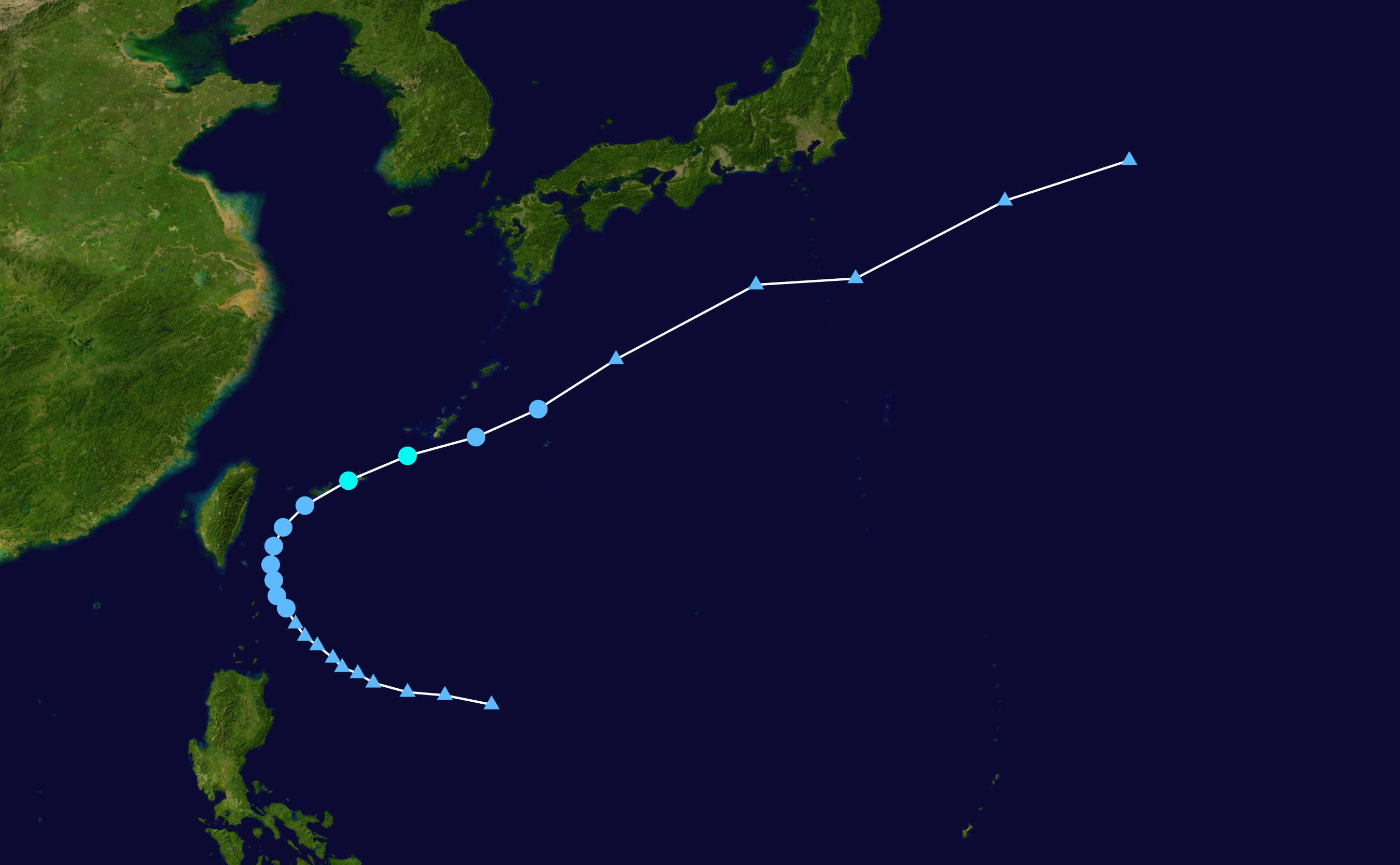
- Duration: October 1 – October 3
- Peak intensity: Winds not specified; 999 hPa (mbar)

The strom formed on October 1. It moved northwest, and later northeast, while strengthening into a tropical storm.

=== Typhoon Viola ===
- Typhoon (JMA)
- Category 3 typhoon (SSHWS)
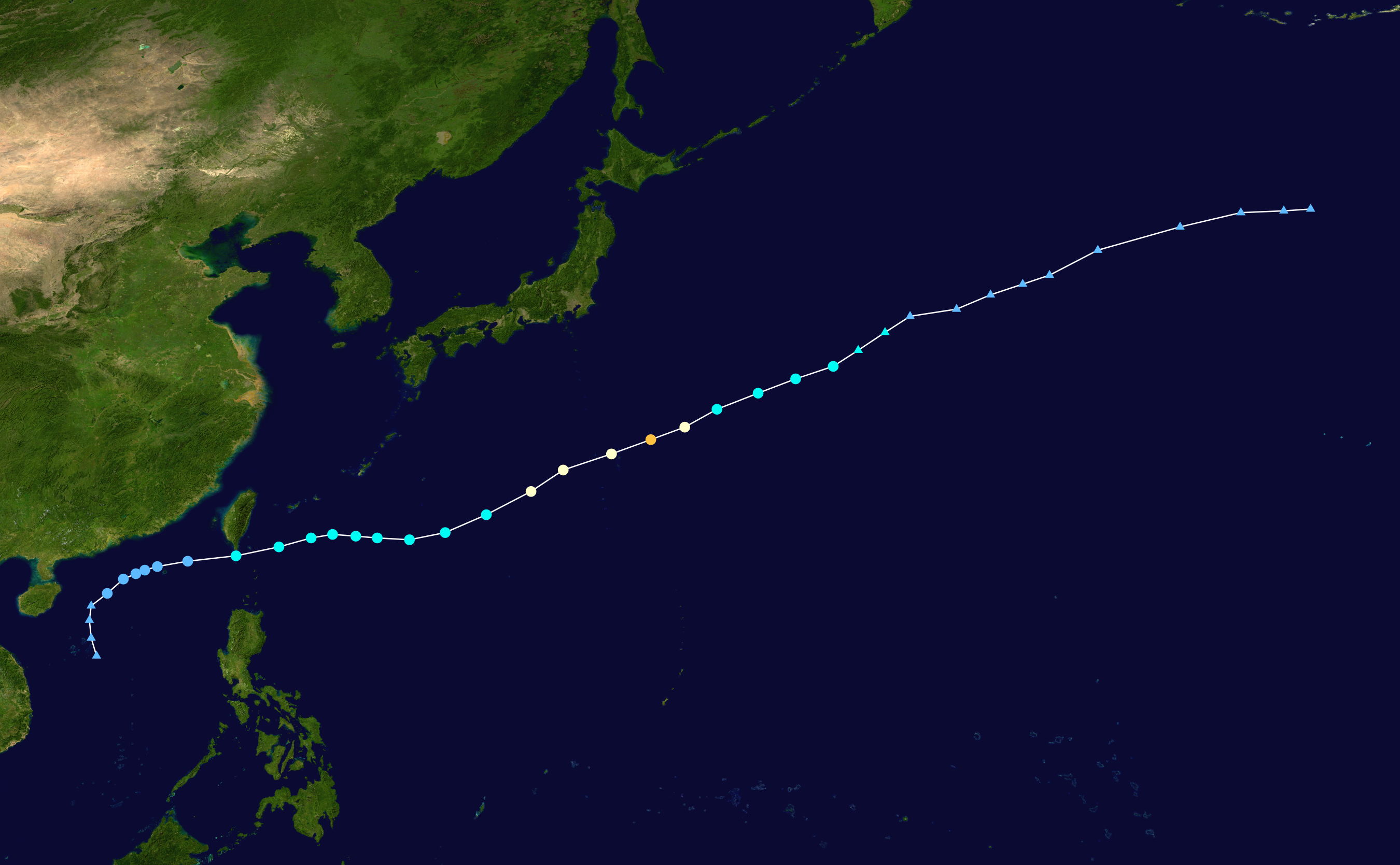
- Duration: October 3 – October 8
- Peak intensity: 185 km/h (115 mph) (1-min); 965 hPa (mbar)

Viola formed on October 3 in the South China Sea. It later moved east and strengthened into a Category 3 typhoon. Viola turned extratropical on October 8.

=== Typhoon Winnie ===
- Typhoon (JMA)
- Category 1 typhoon (SSHWS)
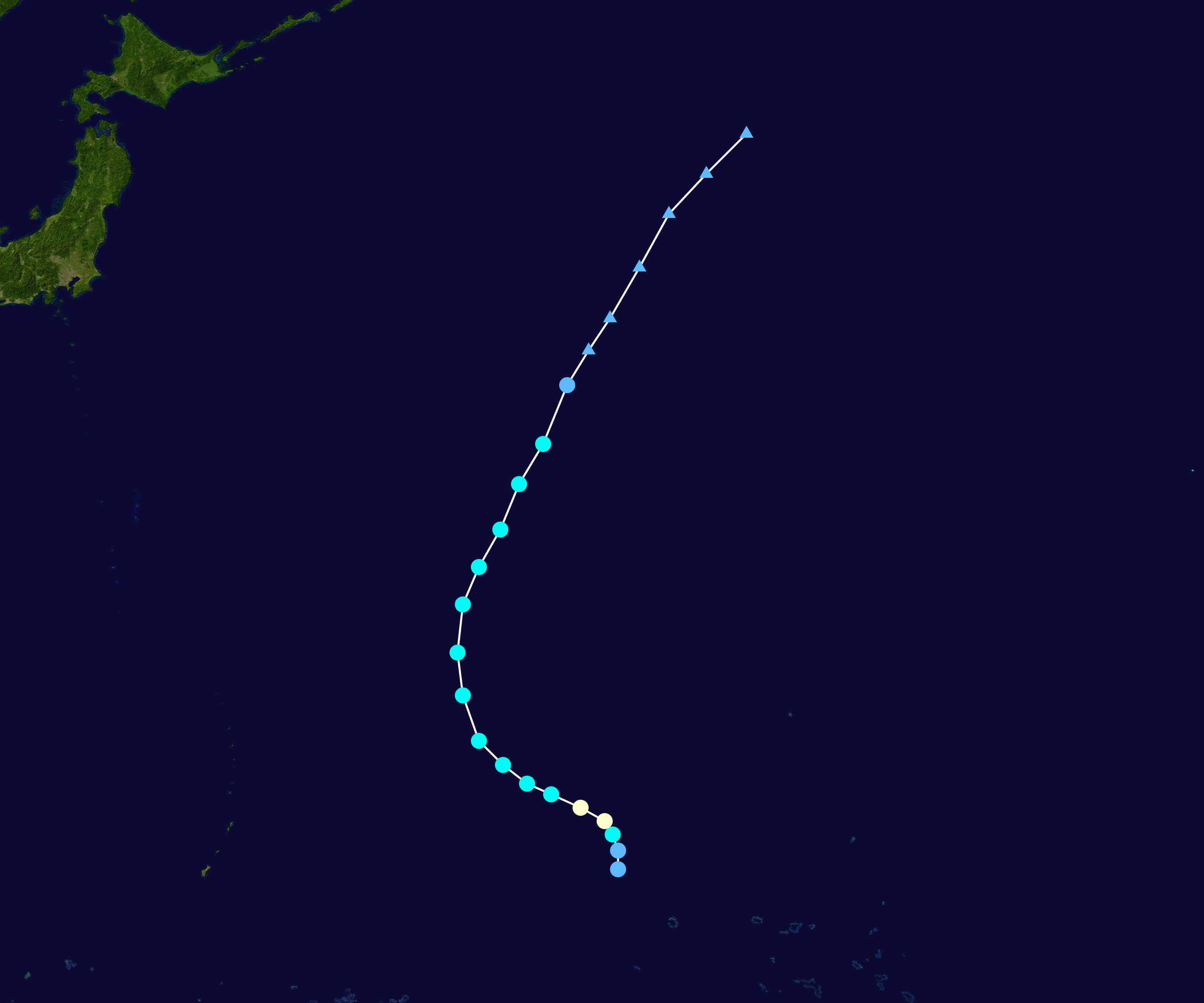
- Duration: October 6 – October 9
- Peak intensity: 120 km/h (75 mph) (1-min); 990 hPa (mbar)

Winnie was a Category 1 typhoon that didn't affect land.

=== Typhoon Alice ===
- Typhoon (JMA)
- Category 3 typhoon (SSHWS)
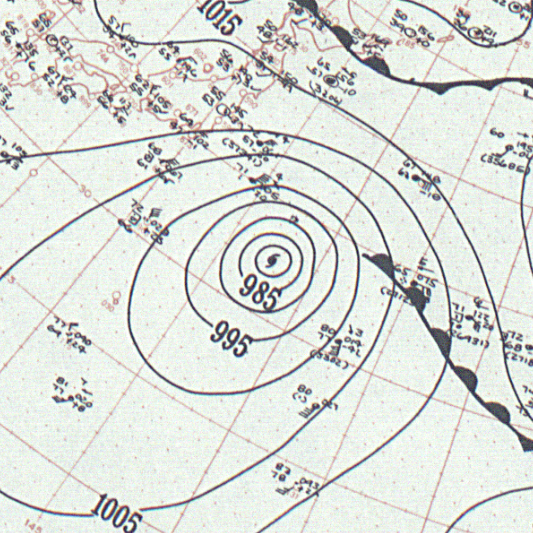
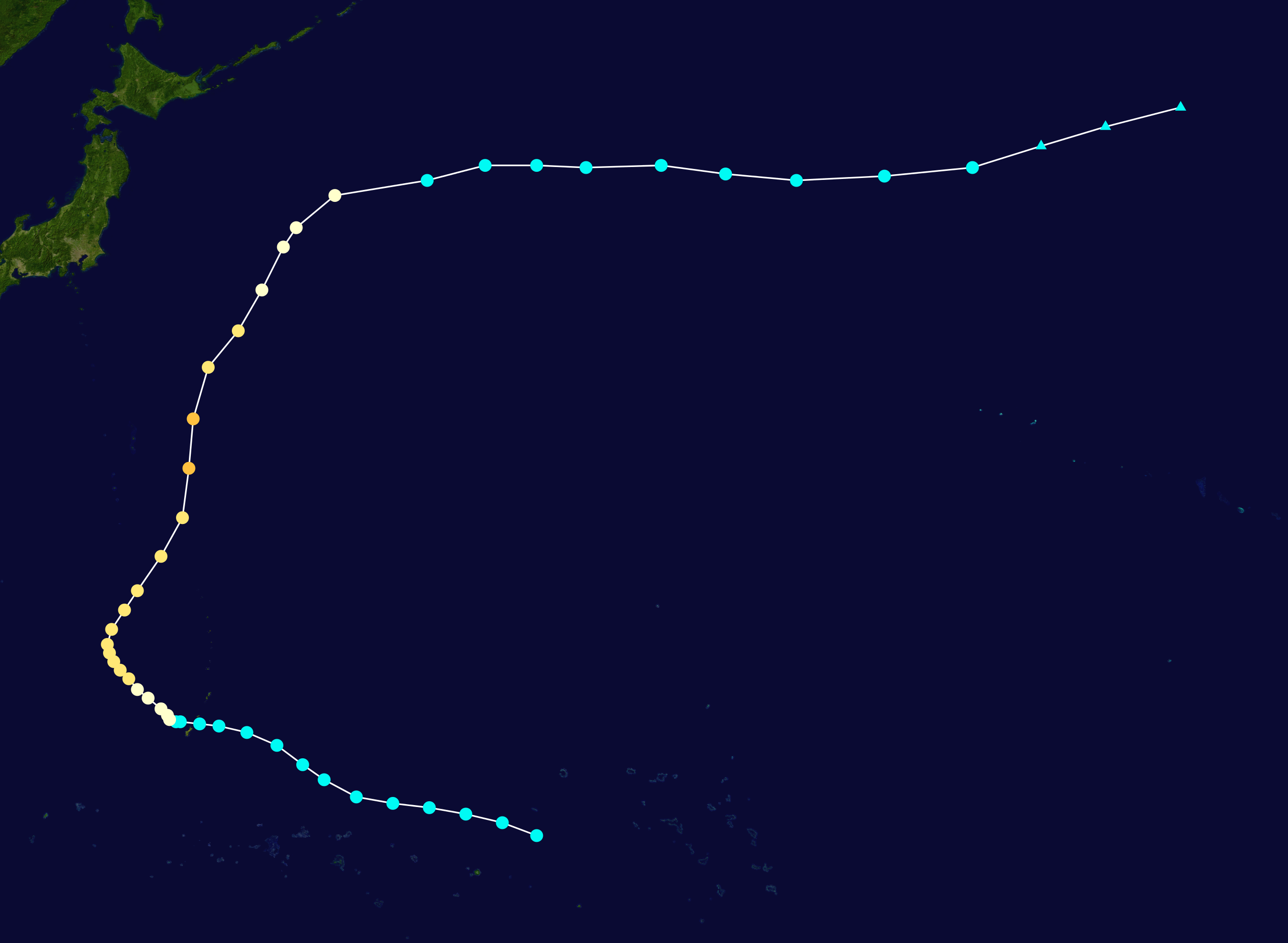
- Duration: October 11 – October 23
- Peak intensity: 185 km/h (115 mph) (1-min); 915 hPa (mbar)

The Fleet Weather Central (FWC) and the Central Meteorological Observatory (CMO) began tracking a system west of the Marshall Islands on October 11. It slowly strengthened while moving west-northwest, slowing near Guam. After October 15, Alice turned northwest, intensifying further. It reached peak intensity near Iwo Jima on October 19 at 100 knots (though stronger winds near the eye were likely unobserved). Alice then weakened into a tropical storm, turning east and accelerating away from Japan. By October 22, near the International Date Line (IDL), it weakened to 35 knots. The CMO declared it extratropical six hours later as it crossed the IDL. The cyclone restrengthened to 60 knots by October 23, when the FWC ceased tracking.

=== Typhoon Betty ===
- Typhoon (JMA)
- Category 4 super typhoon (SSHWS)
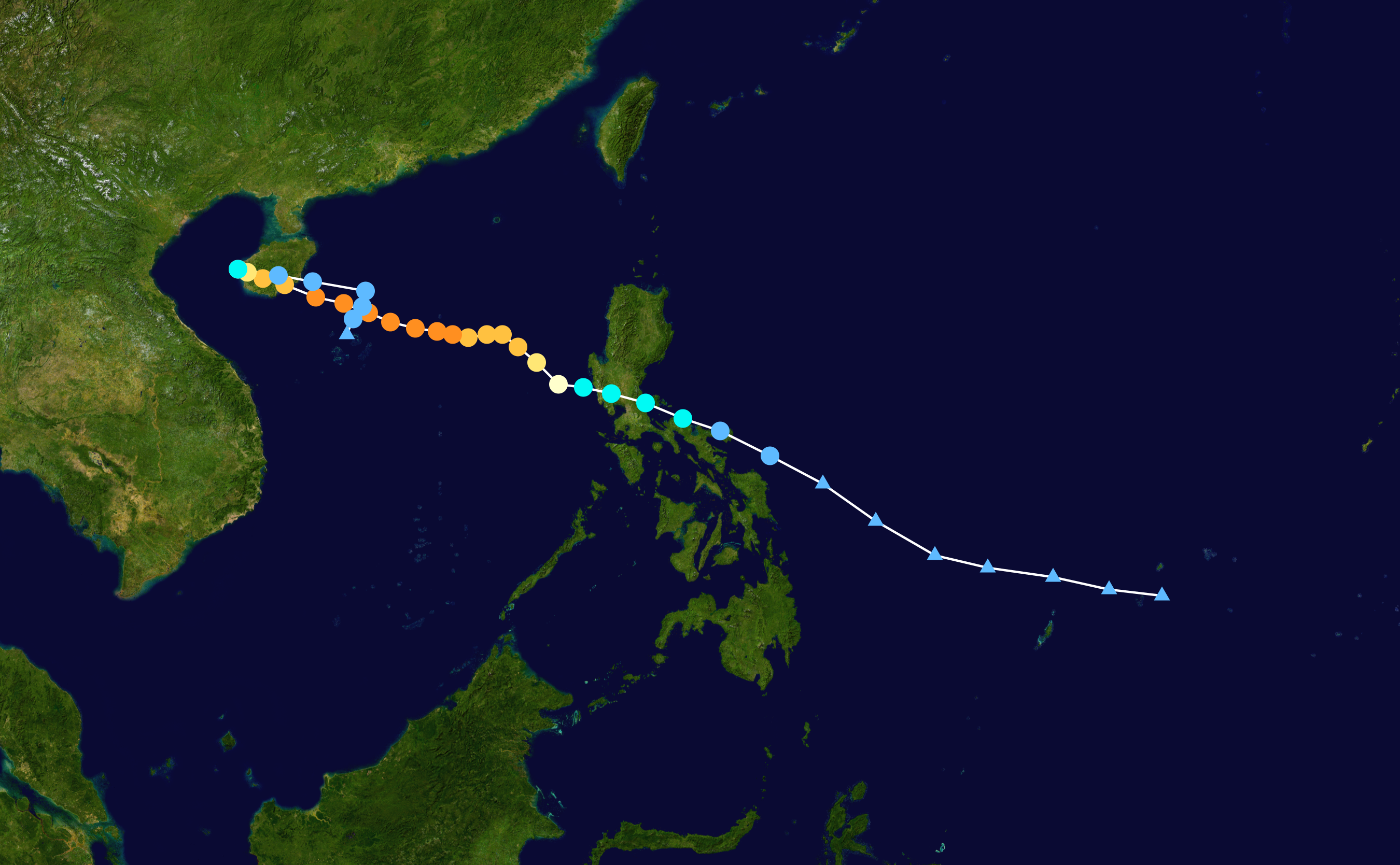
- Duration: October 25 – November 2
- Peak intensity: 240 km/h (150 mph) (1-min); 965 hPa (mbar)

Betty hit China and then took an unusual track; going from west to east.

=== Typhoon Cora ===
- Typhoon (JMA)
- Category 4 typhoon (SSHWS)
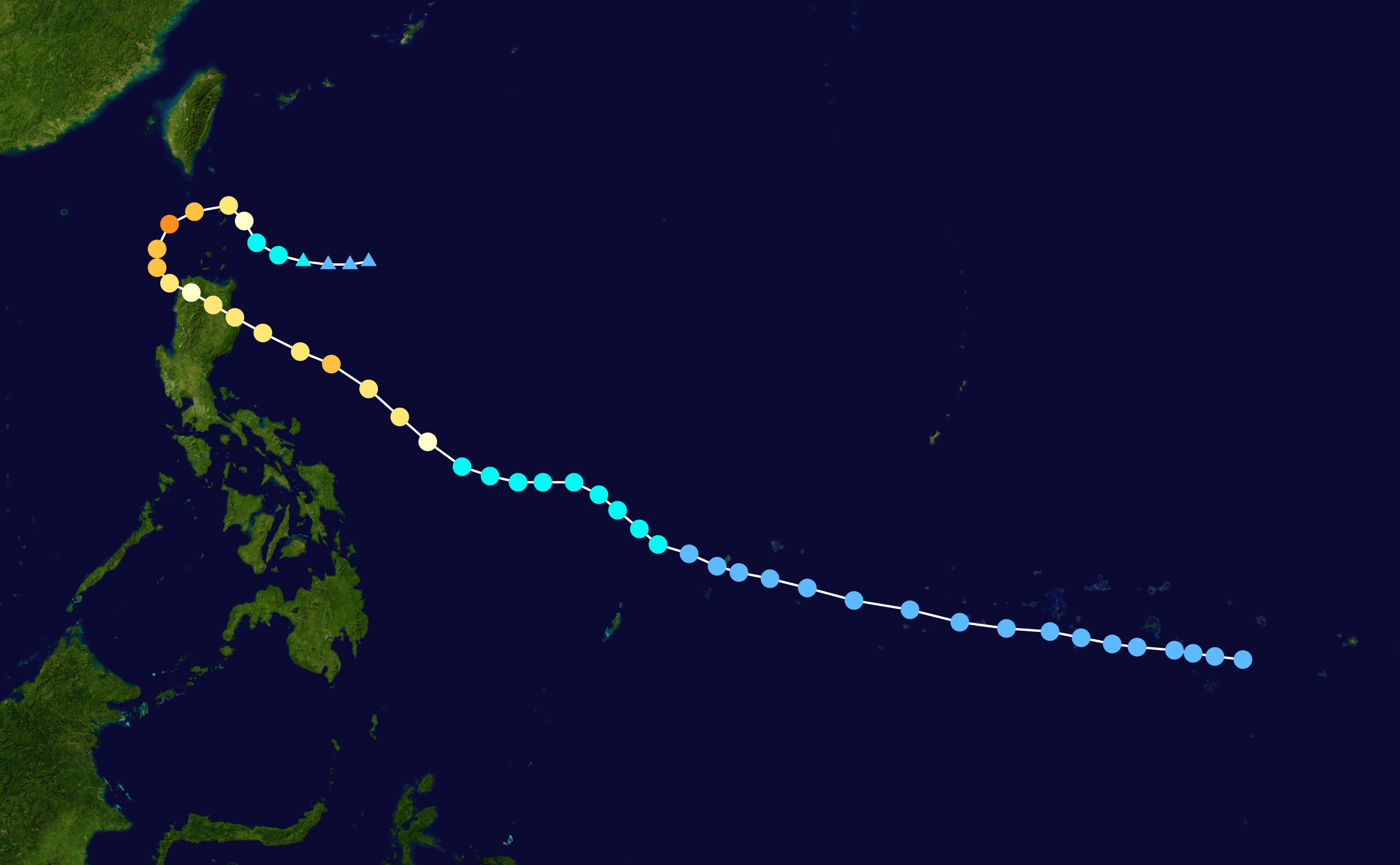
- Duration: November 8 – November 20
- Peak intensity: 220 km/h (140 mph) (1-min); 960 hPa (mbar)

Cora crossed the northern Philippines and hit its peak strength, then rapidly weakened and dissipated.

=== Tropical Storm 22W ===
- Tropical storm (JMA)
- Tropical storm (SSHWS)
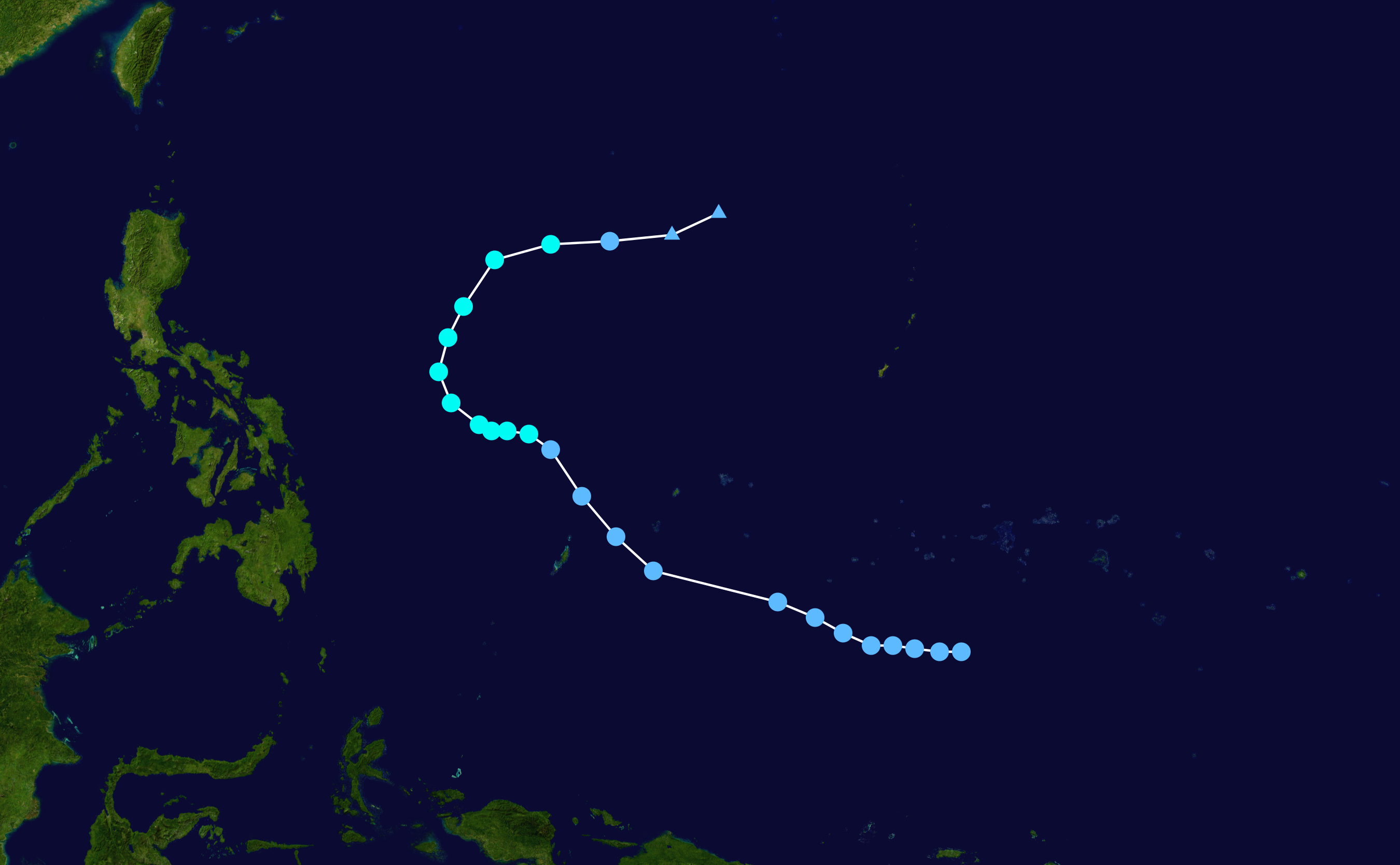
- Duration: November 25 – November 29
- Peak intensity: 75 km/h (45 mph) (1-min); 1000 hPa (mbar)

22W existed from November 25 to November 29. It didn't affect land.

=== Tropical Storm 23W ===
- Tropical storm (JMA)
- Tropical storm (SSHWS)
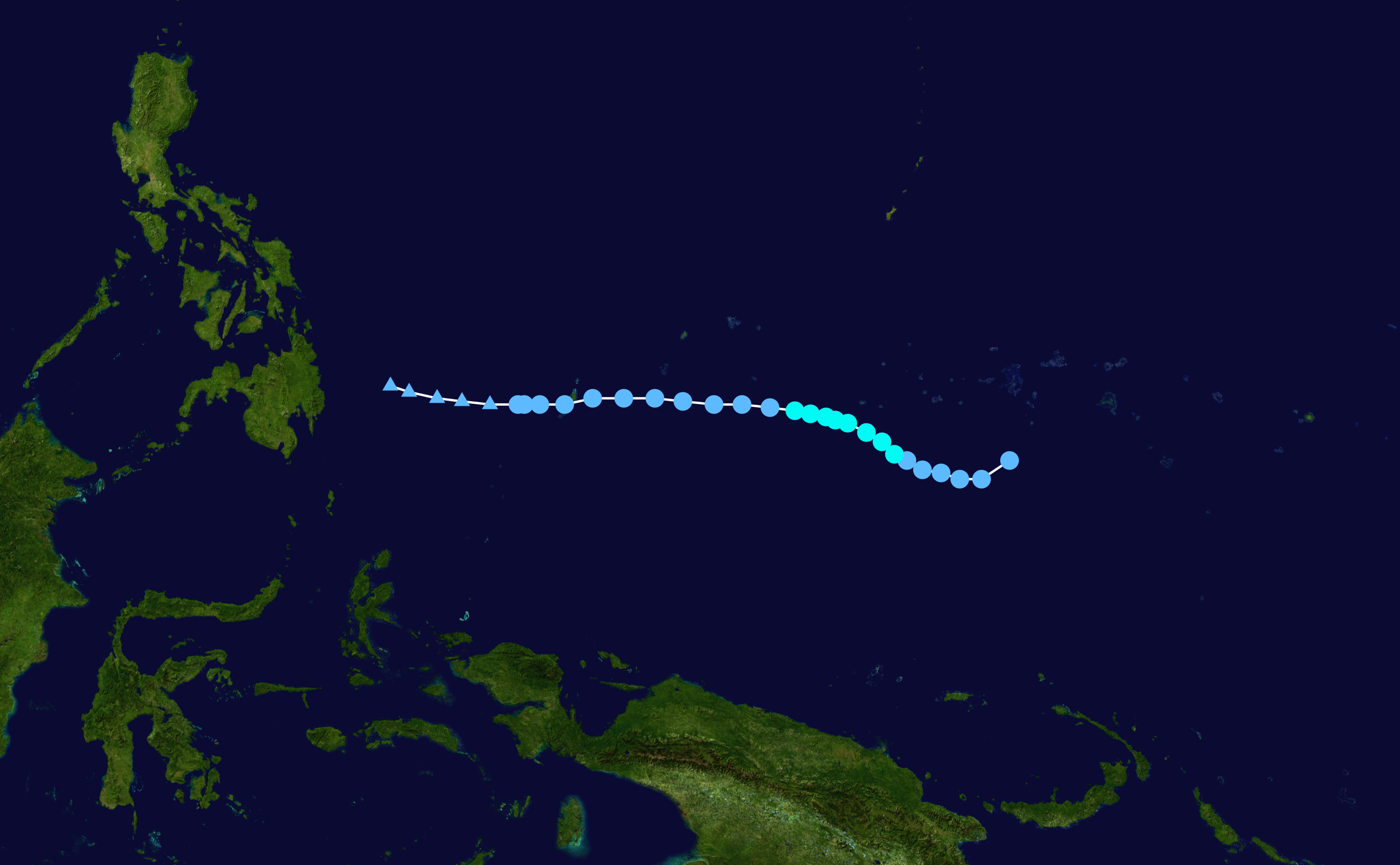
- Duration: November 28 – December 3
- Peak intensity: 75 km/h (45 mph) (1-min); 1000 hPa (mbar)

23W was a short lived tropical storm. It existed from November 28 to December 3.

=== Super Typhoon Doris ===
- Typhoon (JMA)
- Category 5 super typhoon (SSHWS)
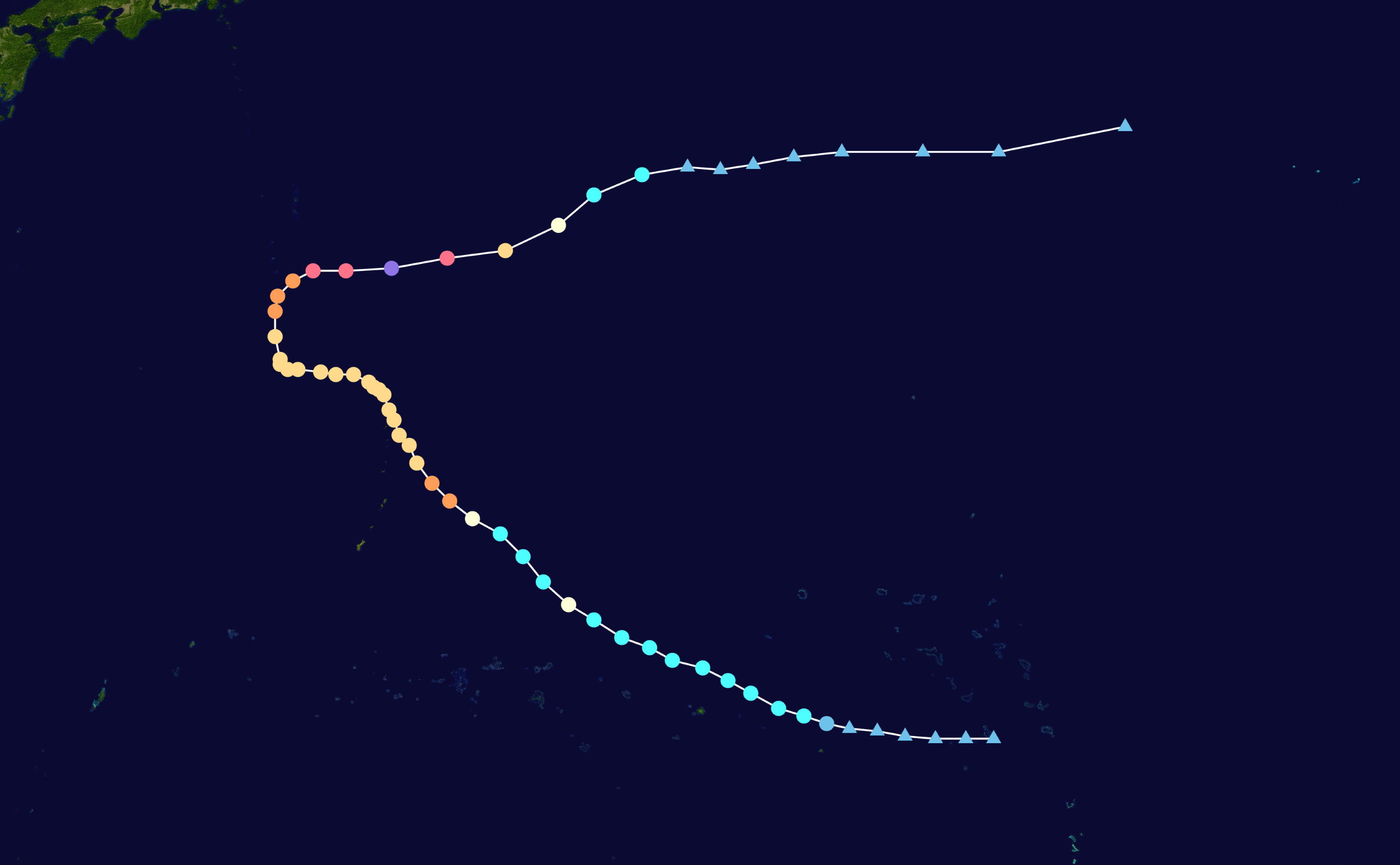
- Duration: December 9 – December 22
- Peak intensity: 280 km/h (175 mph) (1-min); 935 hPa (mbar)

A rare late-season Super Typhoon. Doris did not affect land, but caused nine fatalities when a USAF PB4Y-2 disappeared during a flight into the typhoon.

== Storm names ==
- Irma
- Judy
- Kit
- Lola
- Mamie
- Nina
- Ophelia
- Phyllis
- Rita
- Susan
- Tess
- Viola
- Winnie
- Alice
- Betty
- Cora
- Doris

== See also ==
- 1953 Pacific hurricane season
- 1953 Atlantic hurricane season
- 1953 North Indian Ocean cyclone season
- Australian region cyclone seasons: 1952–53 1953–54
- South Pacific cyclone seasons: 1952–53 1953–54
- South-West Indian Ocean cyclone seasons: 1952–53 1953–54
