= Eastern Pacific Hurricane Center =

The Eastern Pacific Hurricane Center was formerly the center responsible for forecasting Pacific hurricanes in the eastern north Pacific east of 140°W. It was part of the Weather Bureau Forecast Office San Francisco and was based in Redwood City.

The EPHC succeeded the previous forecaster, United States Navy Fleet Weather Center in Alameda starting in the 1970 season, the same year the Central Pacific Hurricane Center took responsibility for the region west of 140°W to the international date line. It held that role until spring 1988, when it was folded into the National Hurricane Center, which took responsibility for the basin starting in the 1988 season.

== See also ==
- National Hurricane Center
- Regional Specialized Meteorological Center
