= 1950s North Indian Ocean cyclone seasons =

Seasonal boundaries
- First system formed: April 8, 1950
- Last system dissipated: 1960

Seasonal statistics
- Depressions: 71
- Total fatalities: 12,500+
- Total damage: Unknown

The years between 1950 and 1959 featured the 1950s North Indian Ocean cyclone seasons. Each season was an ongoing event in the annual cycle of tropical cyclone formation. The North Indian tropical cyclone season has no bounds, but they tend to form between April and December, peaks in May and November. These dates conventionally delimit the period of each year when most tropical cyclones form in the northern Indian Ocean. Below are the most significant cyclones in the time period. Because much of the North Indian coastline is near sea level and prone to flooding, these cyclones can easily kill many with storm surge and flooding. These cyclones are among the deadliest on earth in terms of numbers killed. At the time, only one RSMC, the India Meteorological Department (IMD), monitored the basin. However, in 1959, the Joint Typhoon Warning Center (JTWC) was founded, resulting in it releasing unofficial advisories for the basin.

== 1950 season ==
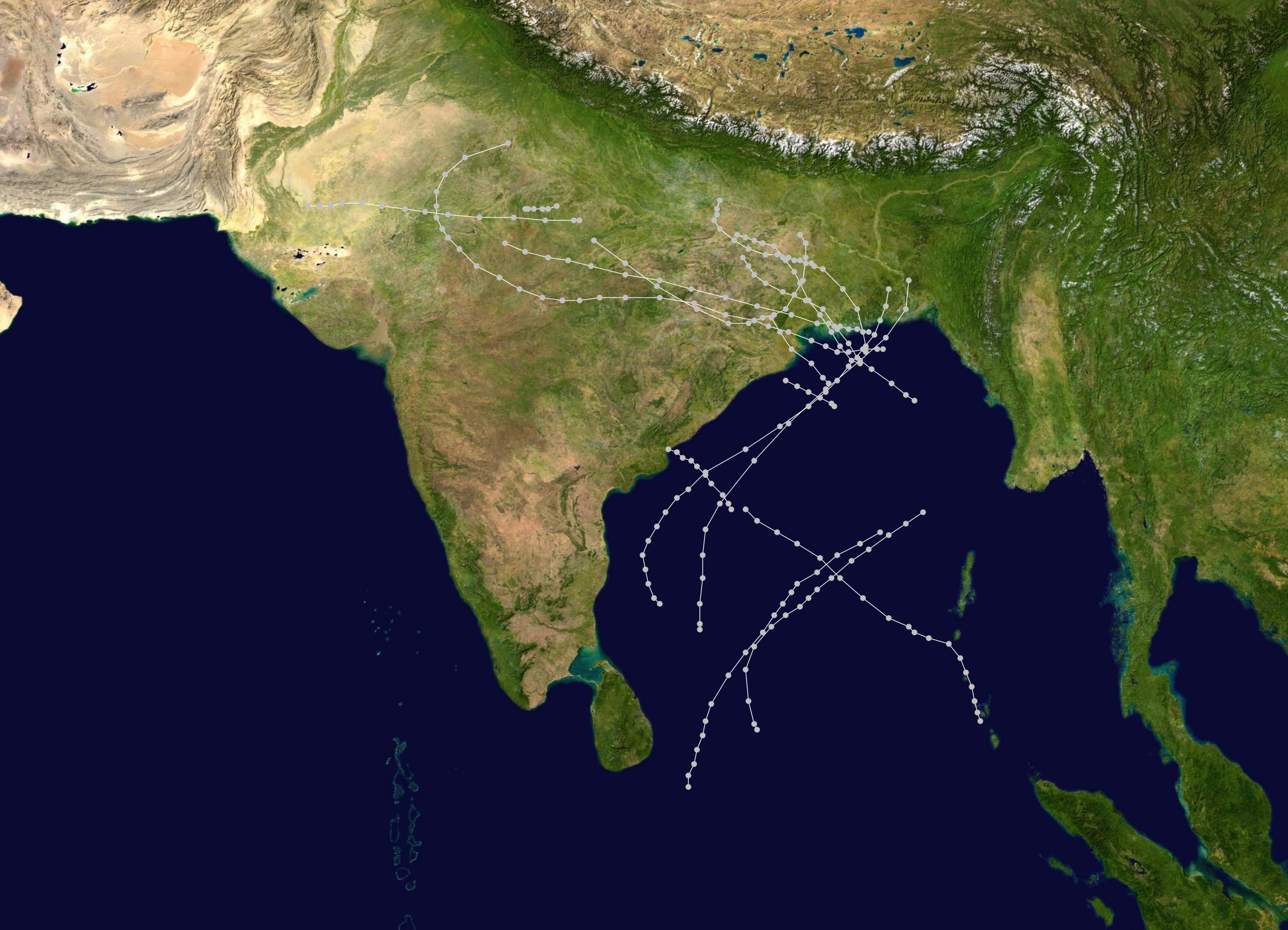
Season summary

- April 8–13, 1950 – A deep depression existed over the Bay of Bengal.
- May 23–30, 1950 – A deep depression existed over the Bay of Bengal.
- June 8–12, 1950 – A cyclonic storm existed over the Bay of Bengal.
- June 23–28, 1950 – A depression existed over the Bay of Bengal.
- July 10–12, 1950 – A depression existed over the Bay of Bengal.
- July 11–15, 1950 – A depression existed over land.
- July 25–30, 1950 – A depression existed over the Bay of Bengal.
- August 3–7, 1950 – A depression existed over land.
- August 9–15, 1950 – A depression existed over the Bay of Bengal.
- September 1–5, 1950 – A depression existed over land.
- September 9–11, 1950 – A depression existed over the Bay of Bengal.
- September 12–19, 1950 – A cyclonic storm existed over the Bay of Bengal.
- September 22–24, 1950 – A depression existed over the Bay of Bengal.
- October 17–22, 1950 – A depression existed over the Bay of Bengal.
- November 16–20, 1950 – A cyclonic storm existed over the Bay of Bengal.
- December 2–6, 1950 – A cyclonic storm existed over the Bay of Bengal.

== 1951 season ==
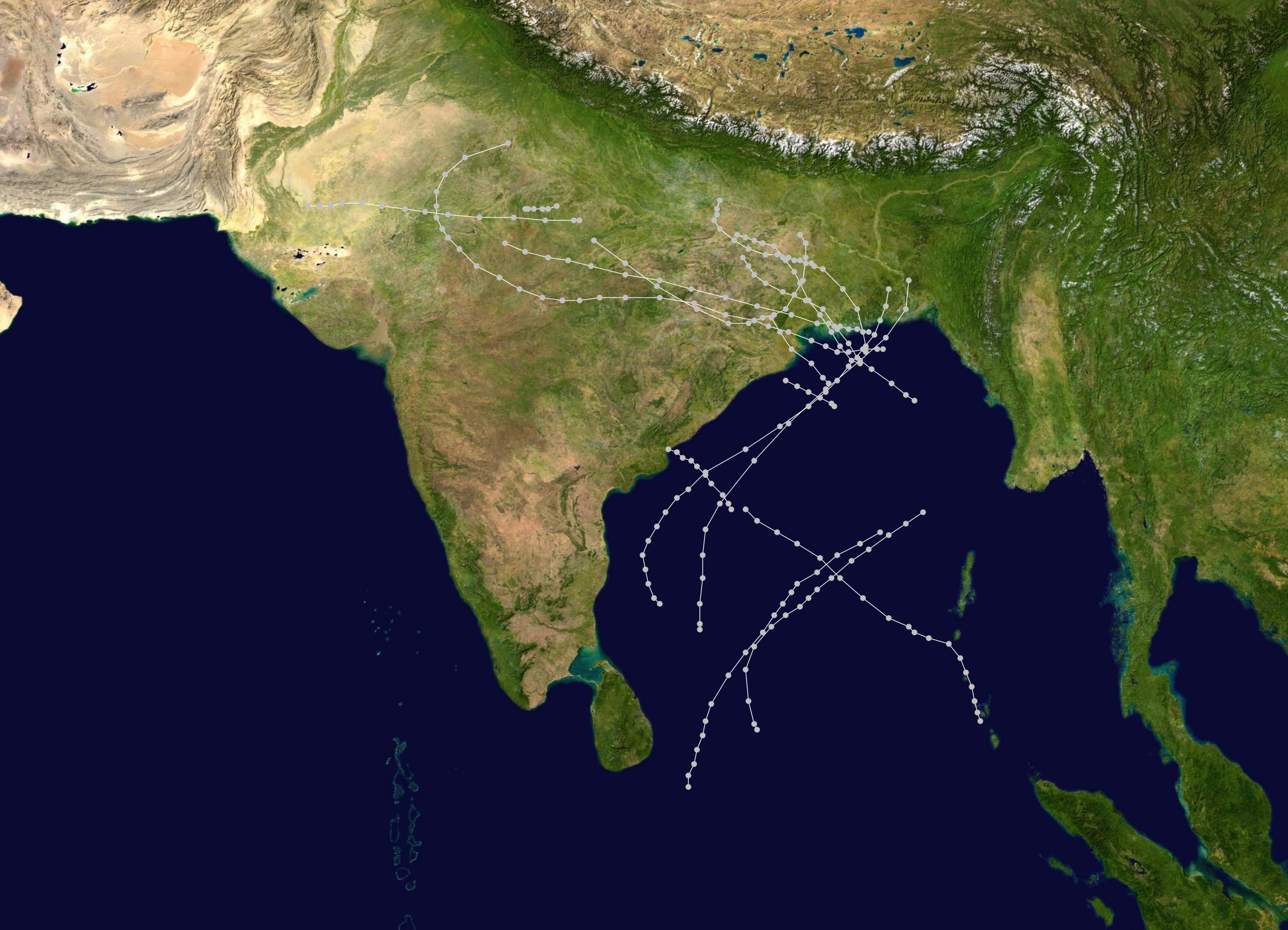
Season summary

- April 15–24, 1951 – A cyclonic storm existed over the Arabian Sea.
- June 4–7, 1951 – A depression existed over the Bay of Bengal.
- June 11–13, 1951 – A depression existed over the Arabian Sea.
- June 26 – July 7, 1951 – A depression existed over the Bay of Bengal.
- July 19–22, 1951 – A depression existed over the Bay of Bengal.
- July 24–29, 1951 – A cyclonic storm existed over the Bay of Bengal.
- July 30 – August 1, 1951 – A depression existed over the Bay of Bengal.
- August 4–5, 1951 – A depression existed over the Bay of Bengal.
- August 16–19, 1951 – A depression existed over the Bay of Bengal.
- August 30 – September 1, 1951 – A depression existed over the Bay of Bengal.
- September 9–13, 1951 – A depression existed over Land.
- October 9–11, 1951 – A depression existed over the Bay of Bengal.
- November 12–19, 1951 – A severe cyclonic storm existed over the Arabian Sea.
- November 23–26, 1951 – A depression existed over the Bay of Bengal.
- December 5–14, 1951 – A severe cyclonic storm existed over the Bay of Bengal.

== 1952 season ==
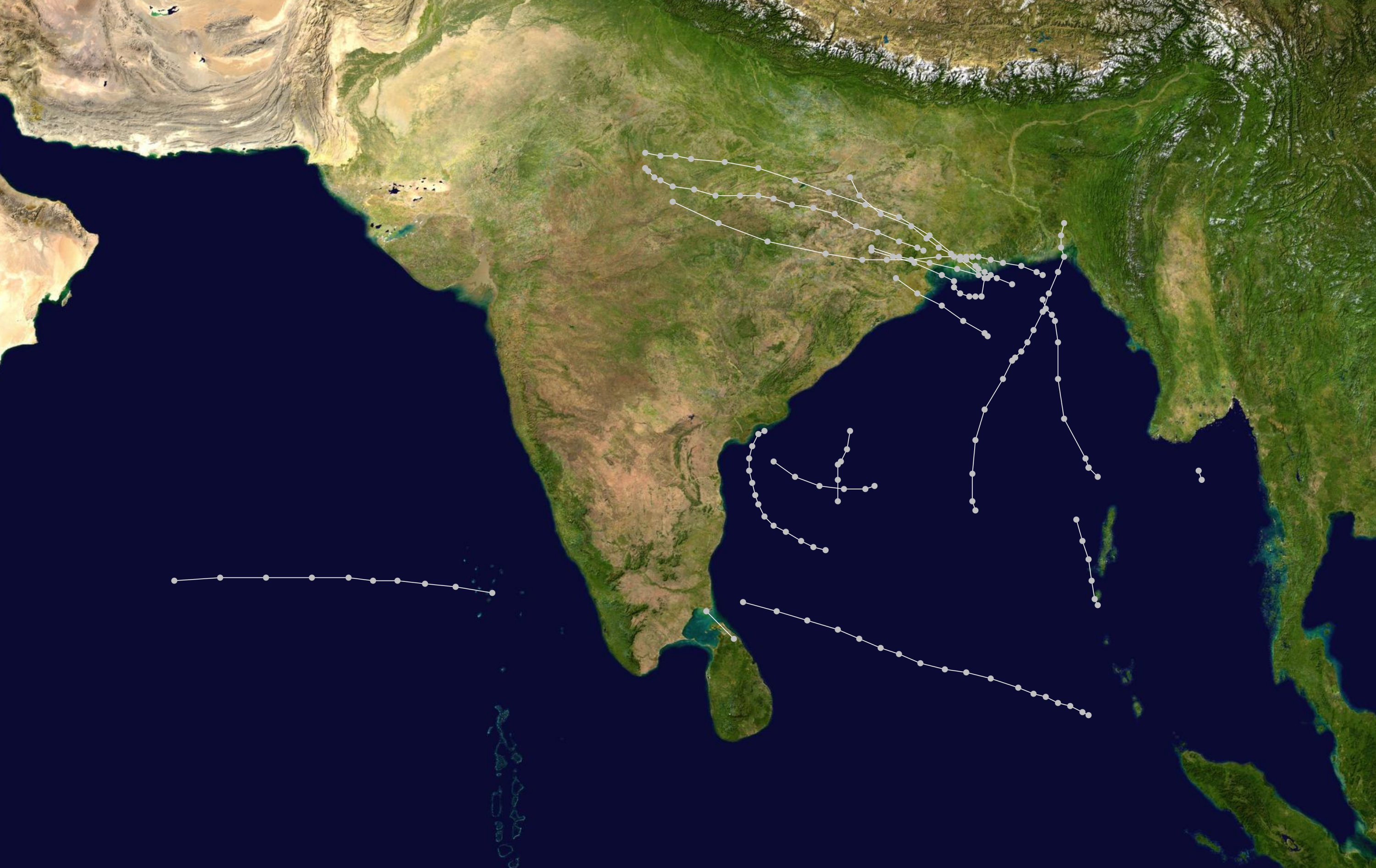
Season summary

- Typhoon Vae crossed over into the Indian Ocean in 1952.

== 1953 season ==
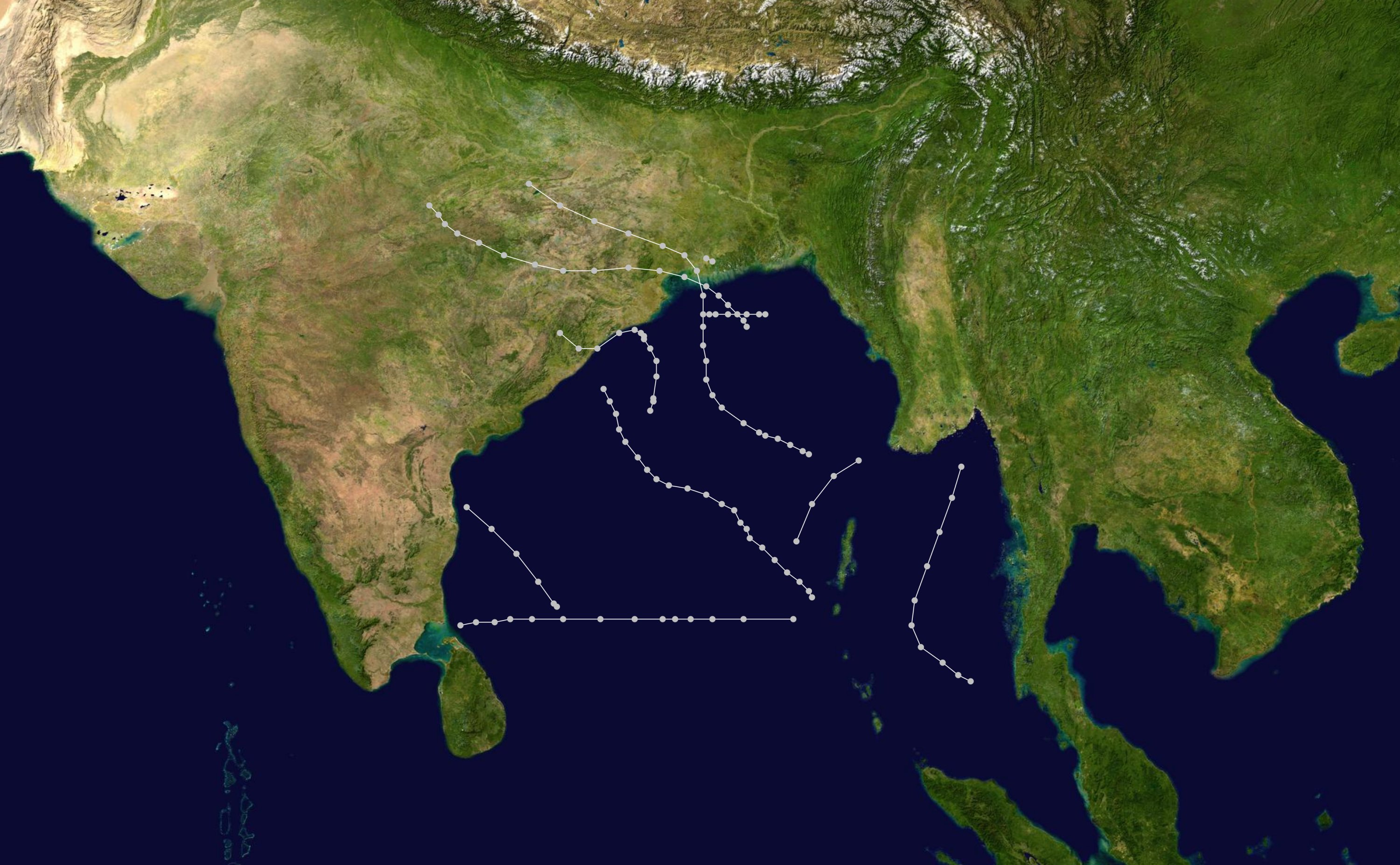
Season summary

== 1954 season ==
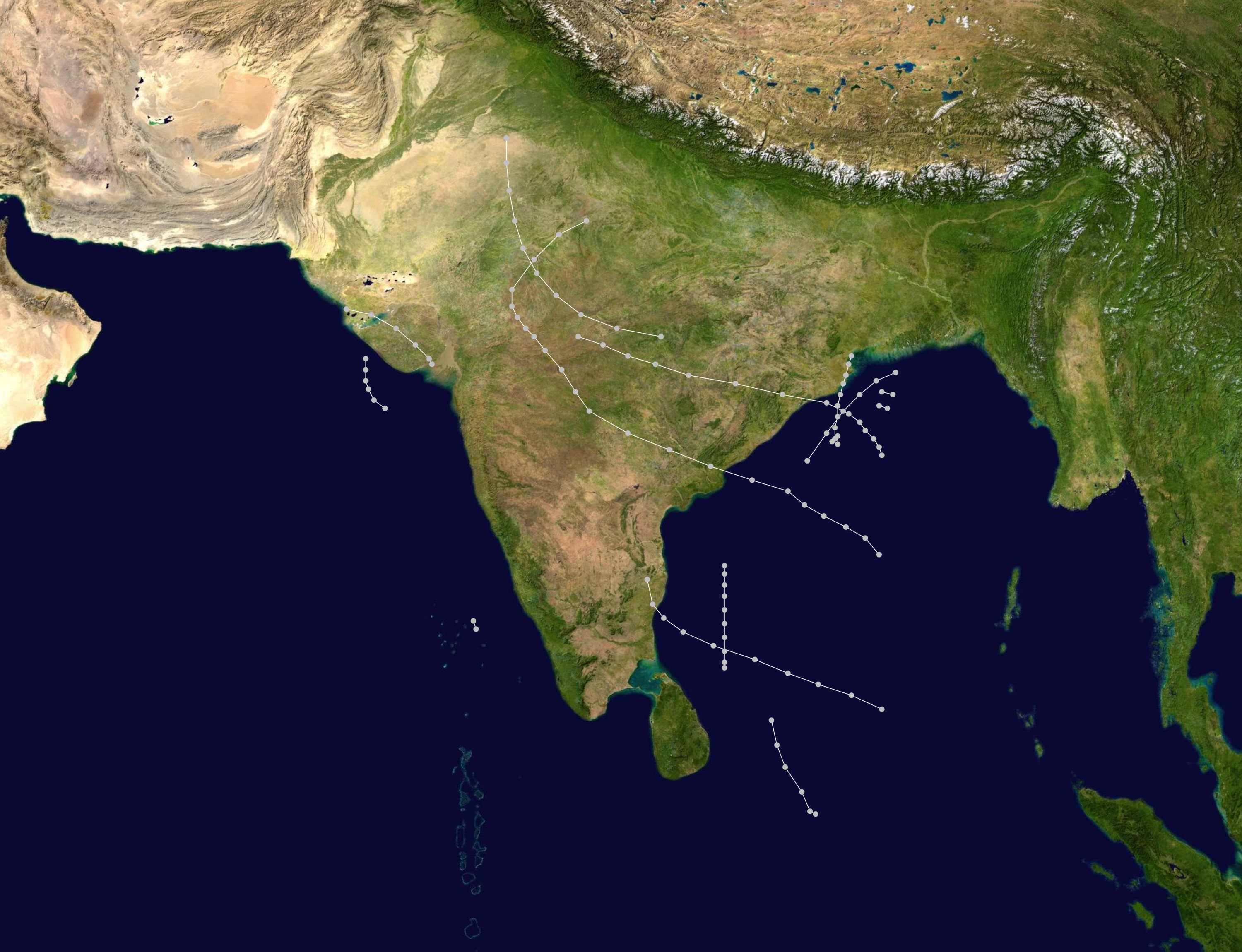
Season summary

== 1955 season ==
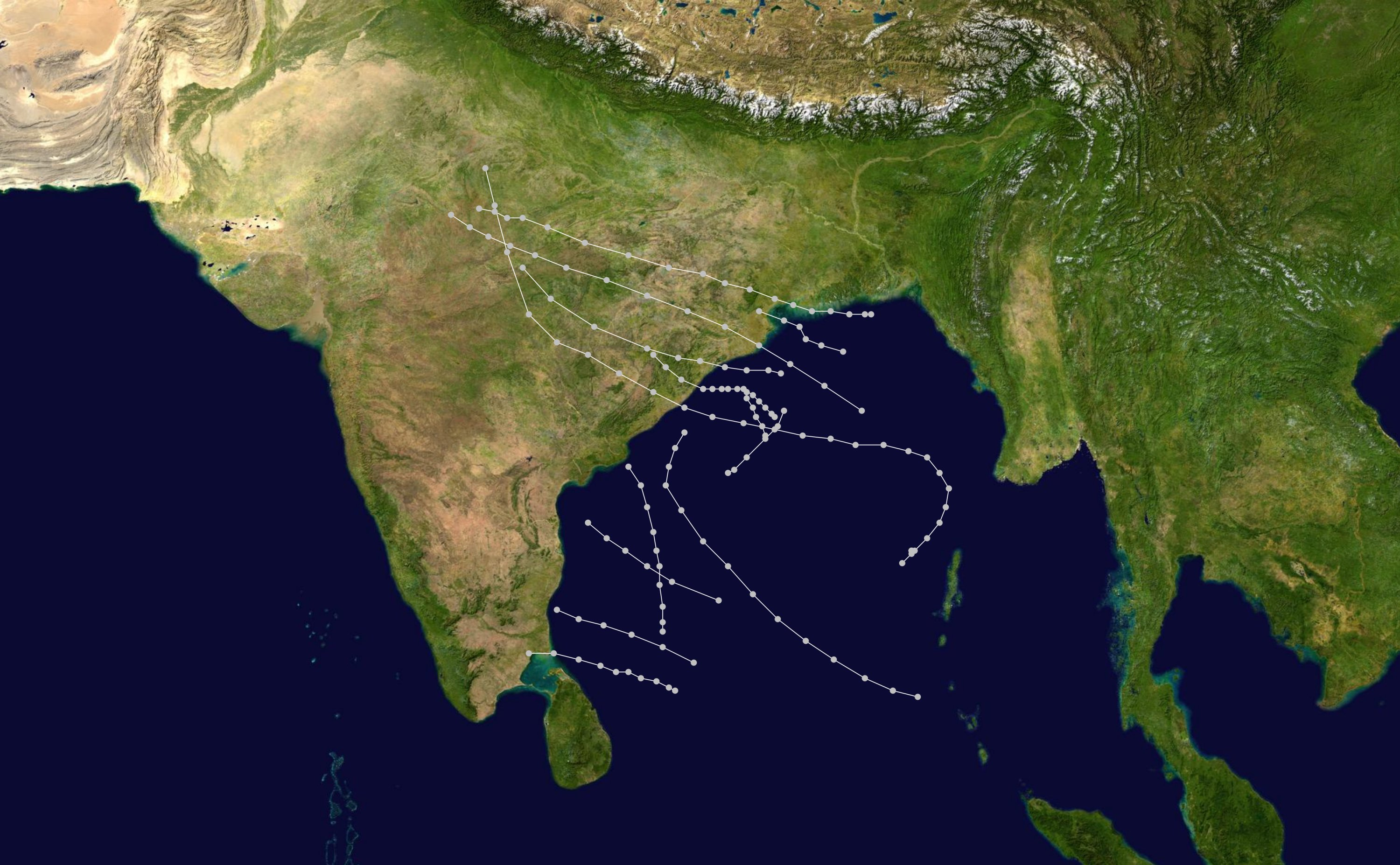
Season summary

== 1956 season ==
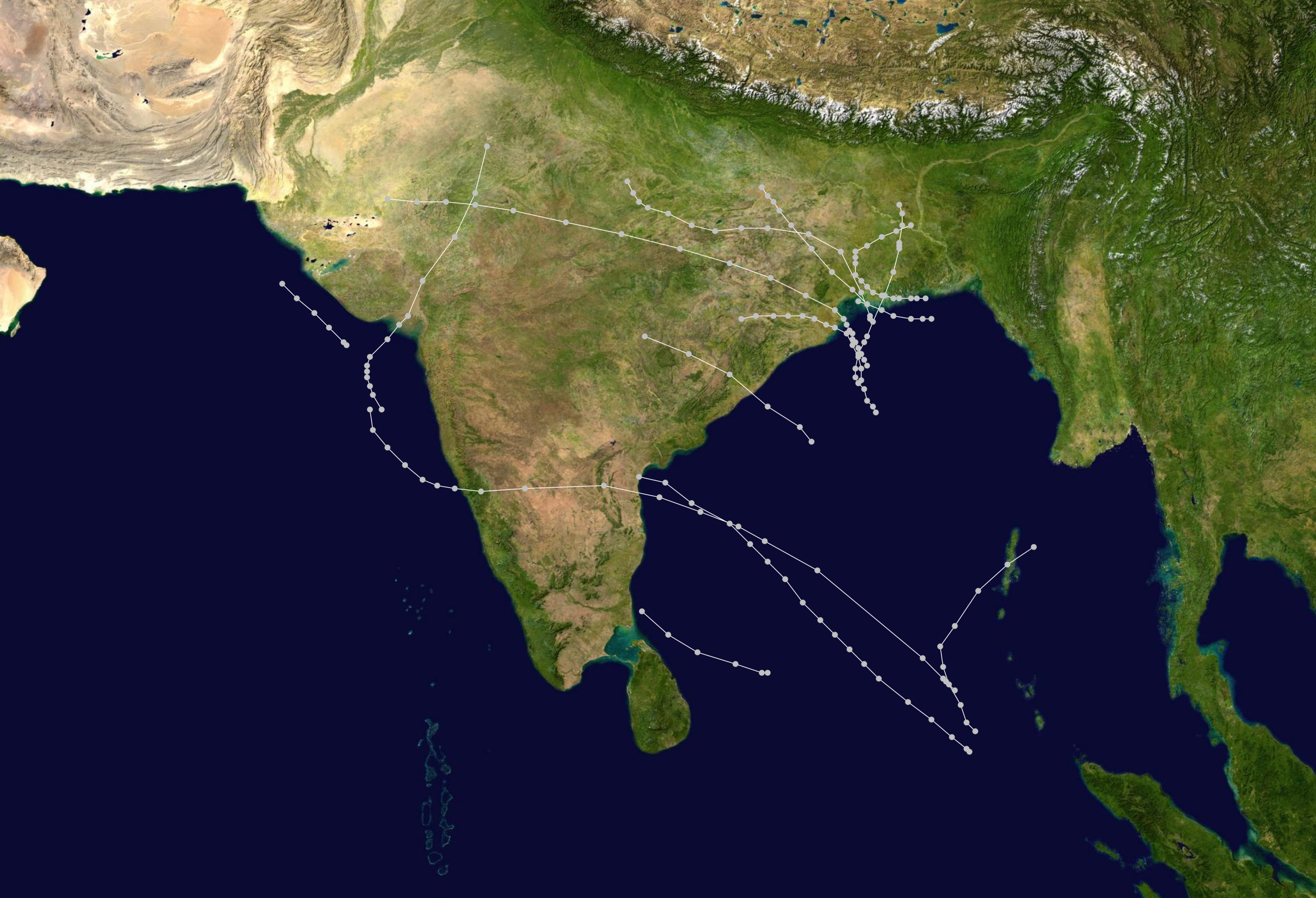
Season summary

=== June 1956 India cyclone ===
This cyclone brought torrential rainfall to Midnapore district in West Bengal. About 20,000 people were left homeless, while another 20,000 people were left stranded near the Assam border after the Haora River topped its banks. There was an estimated 480 fatalities, most caused by landslides.

== 1957 season ==
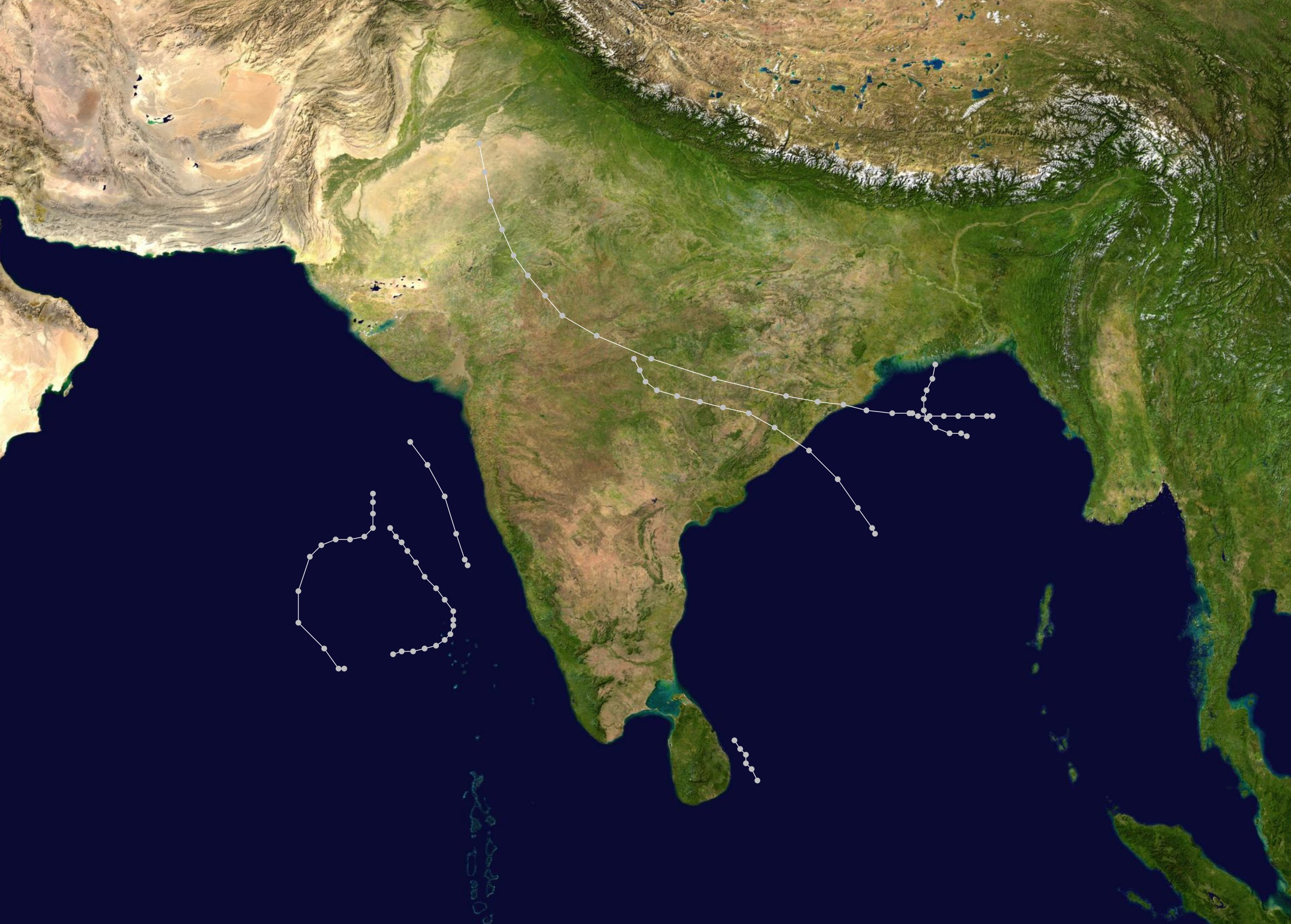
Season summary

=== December 1957 cyclone ===
A cyclone developed over the Arabian Sea near the Gulf of Oman on December 27. Moving westward, the storm lashed Bahrain with winds of 110 mph (180 km/h). An offshore oil rig collapsed, killing 20 Royal Dutch Shell employees.

== 1958 season ==
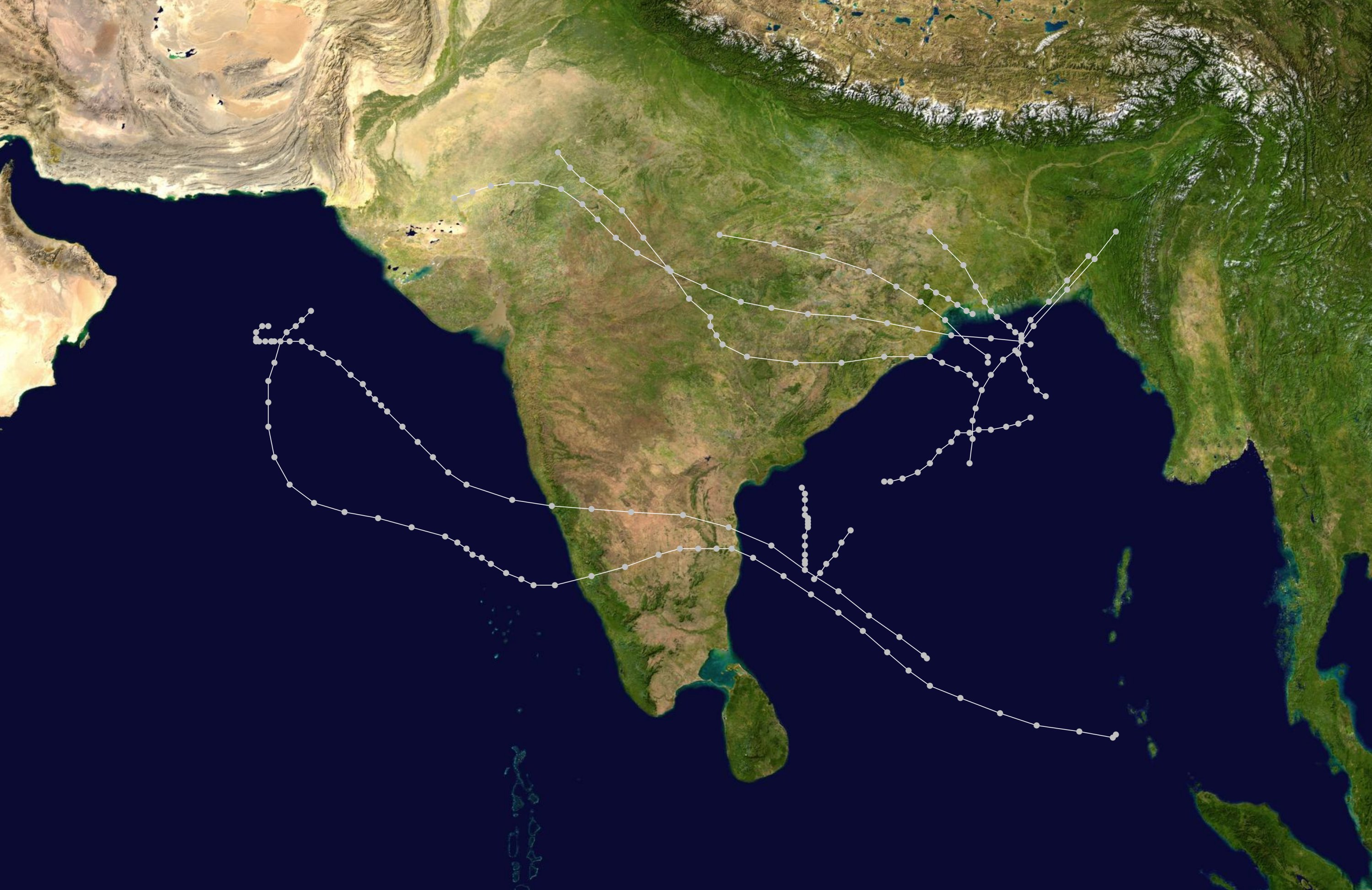
Season summary

A cyclonic storm lasted from October 21–24 and struck Bangladesh (then East Pakistan), causing 12,000 deaths.

== 1959 season ==
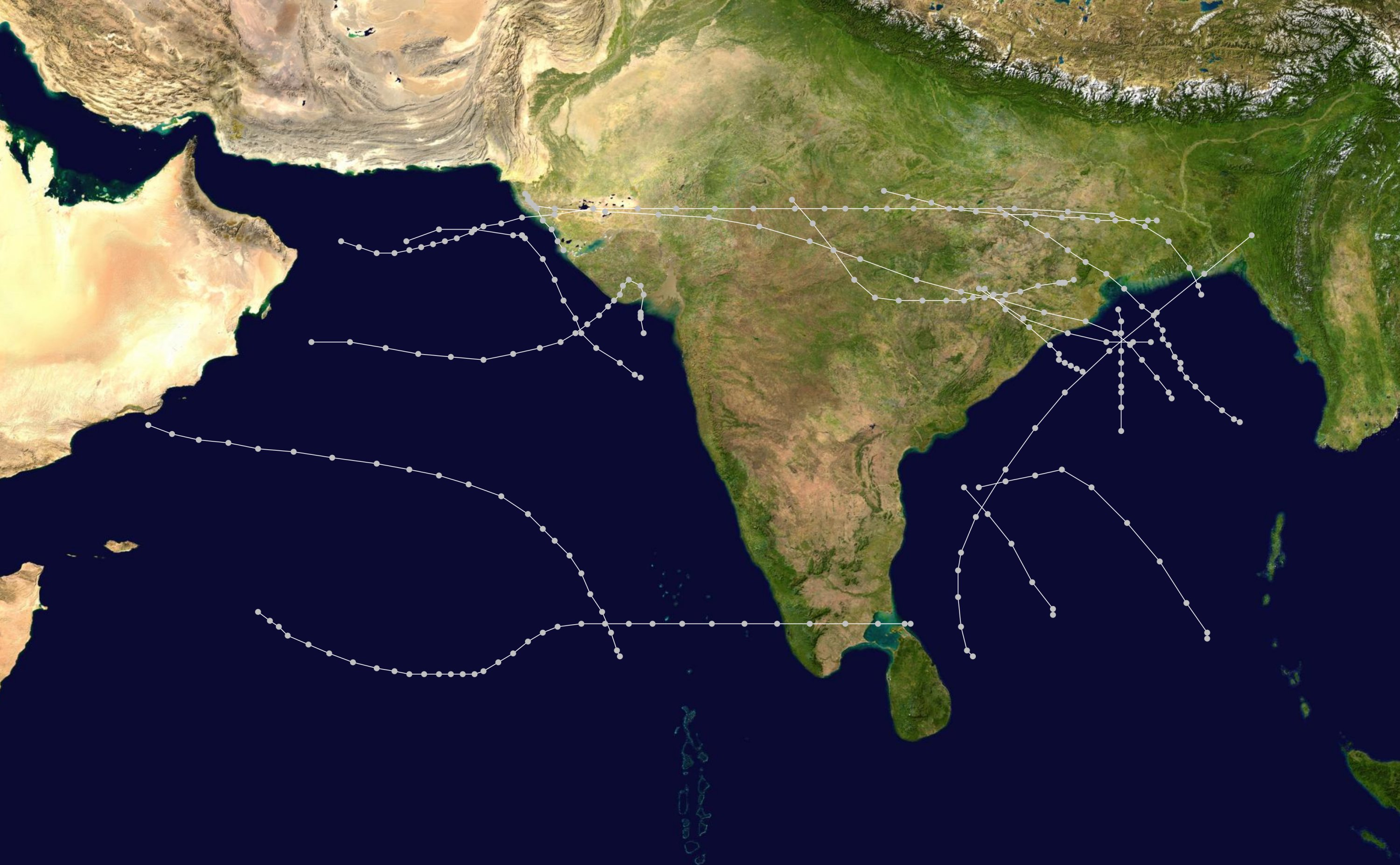
Season summary

=== February 1959 Bahrain cyclone ===
A tropical cyclone impacted Bahrain and caused 500 deaths.

=== May 1959 Salalah cyclone ===
This system first became a low-pressure area near the Laccadive Islands on May 19, tracking northwest towards the Arabian peninsula. The system made landfall at Raysut on May 24. At Salalah, skies clouded over on May 23 as the pressure fell significantly. Winds turned northerly before midnight that night. At 1 a.m. on May 24 the peak of the storm's winds arrived. Maximum sustained winds were estimated at 70 knots (130 km/h) and the pressure at Salalaha fell to 968 millibars (28.6 inHg). Many vessels offshore, including two large passenger ships, went to pieces. Five buildings collapsed and several roofs were blown away by the cyclone. Salalah recorded 82 millimetres (3.2 in) of rain at their airport. A total of 141 lives from the ship Samha were taken during this tempest.

== See also ==
- Atlantic hurricane seasons: 1950, 1951, 1952, 1953, 1954, 1955, 1956, 1957, 1958, 1959
- Pacific hurricane seasons: 1950, 1951, 1952, 1953, 1954, 1955, 1956, 1957, 1958, 1959
- Pacific typhoon seasons: 1950, 1951, 1952, 1953, 1954, 1955, 1956, 1957, 1958, 1959
- 1950s South-West Indian Ocean cyclone seasons
- 1950s Australian region cyclone seasons
- 1950s South Pacific cyclone seasons
