= Cordonazo wind =

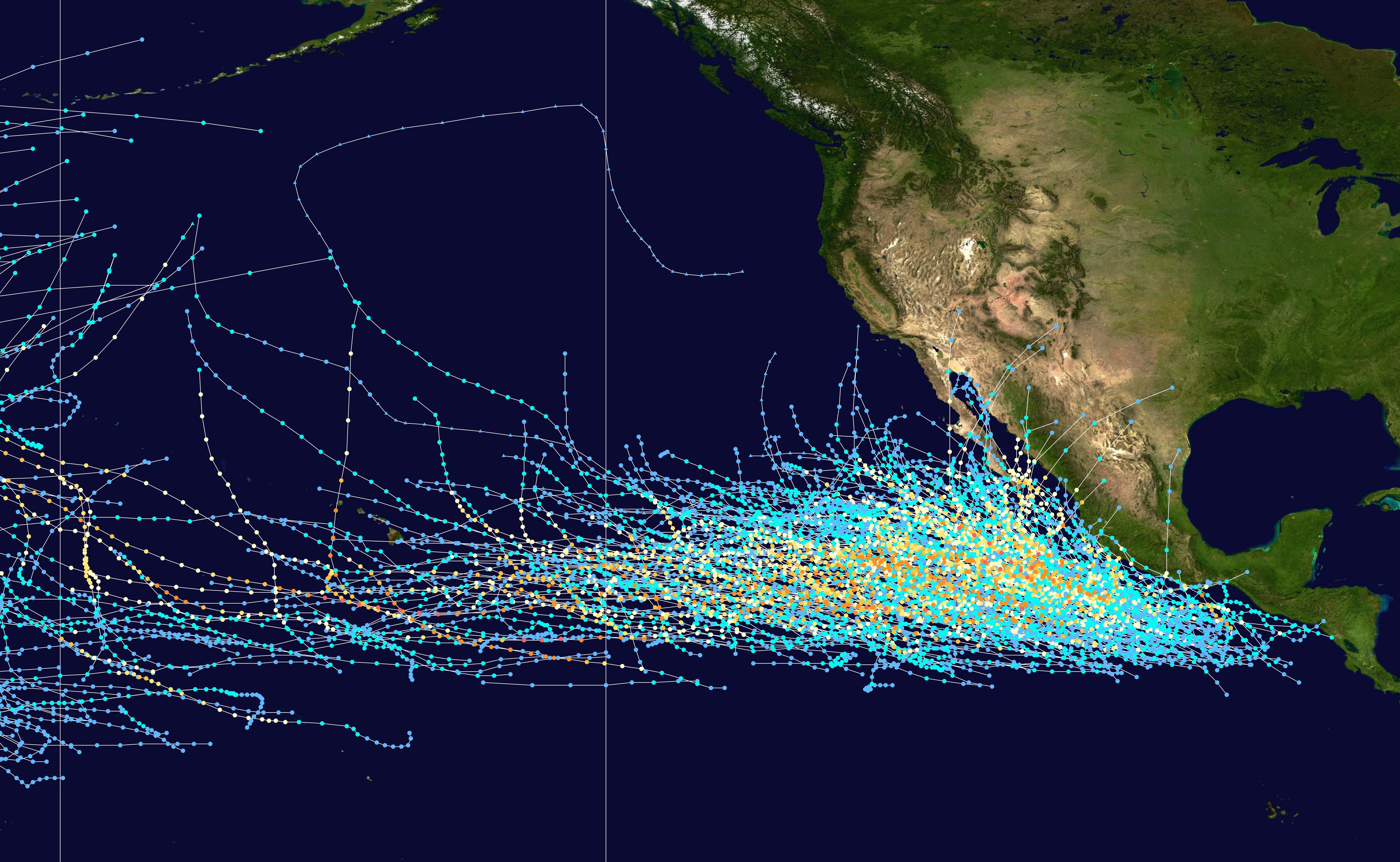
Tracks of East Pacific tropical cyclones (1980–2005). Note the northwestern track of various tropical storms along the west coast of Mexico

Cordonazo winds or the Lash of St. Francis (Spanish: el cordonazo de San Francisco), refers to southerly hurricane winds along the intertropical region (Ecuador, Colombia, Mexico, Panama and Venezuela). In Mexico the term is especially associated with tropical cyclones in the southeastern North Pacific Ocean.

These storms may occur from May to November, but ordinarily affect the coastal areas most severely near or after the Feast of Saint Francis, on October 4.

== Sources ==
Portions of this article originated from the glossary of Bowditch's American Practical Navigator, a document produced by the government of the United States of America.
