= 1952 Pacific hurricane season =

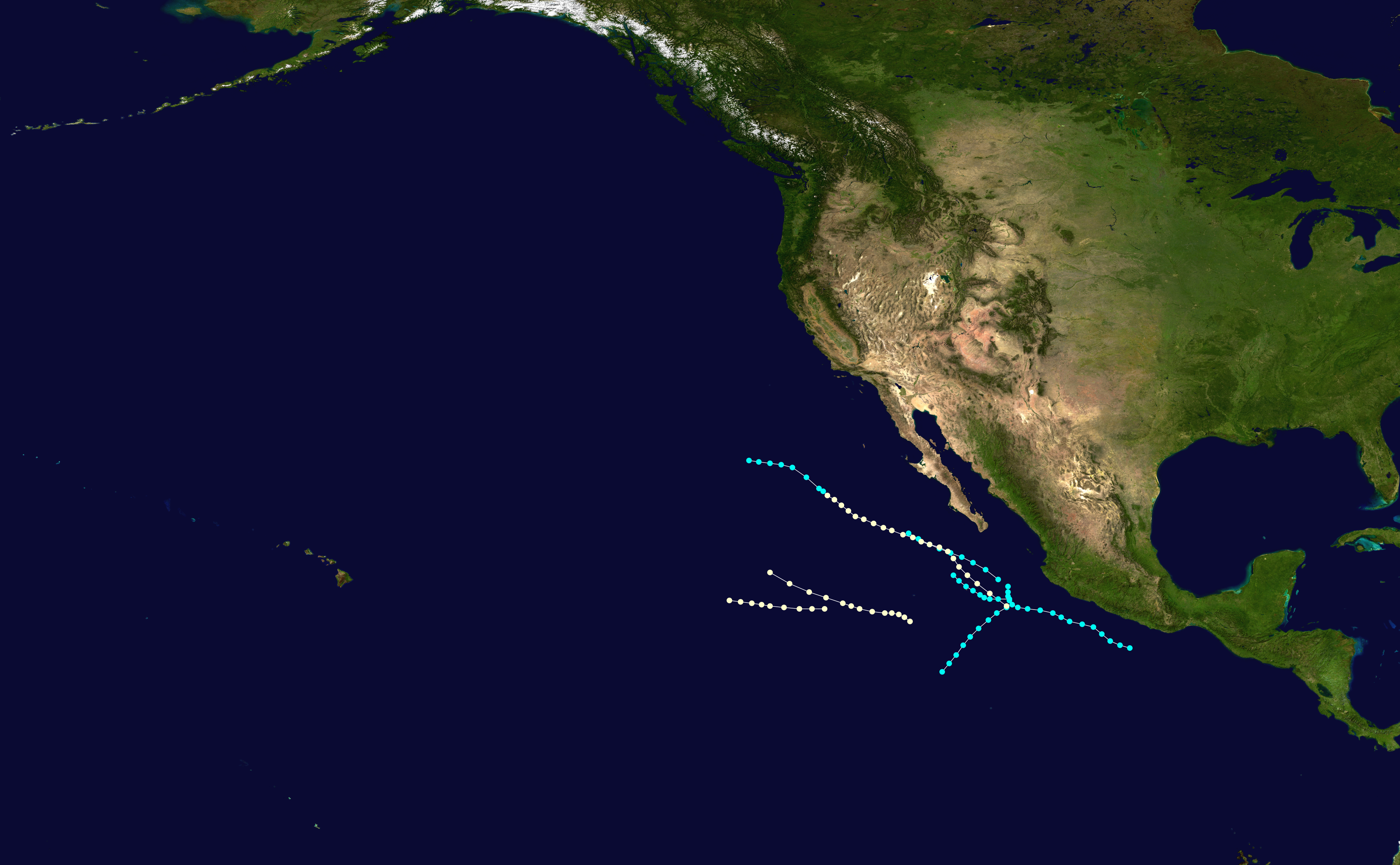
- Season summary map

Seasonal boundaries
- First system formed: May 29, 1952
- Last system dissipated: October 15, 1952

Strongest storm
- Name: Seven, Five
  - Maximum winds: 85 mph (140 km/h) (1-minute sustained)

Seasonal statistics
- Total storms: 7
- Hurricanes: 3
- Major hurricanes (Cat. 3+): 0
- Total fatalities: 0
- Total damage: Unknown

Related articles
- 1952 Atlantic hurricane season; 1952 Pacific typhoon season; 1950s North Indian Ocean cyclone seasons

The 1952 Pacific hurricane season ran through the summer and fall of 1952. Of the seven known tropical cyclones, all remained at sea.

== Systems ==
=== Tropical Storm One ===
- Tropical storm (SSHWS)
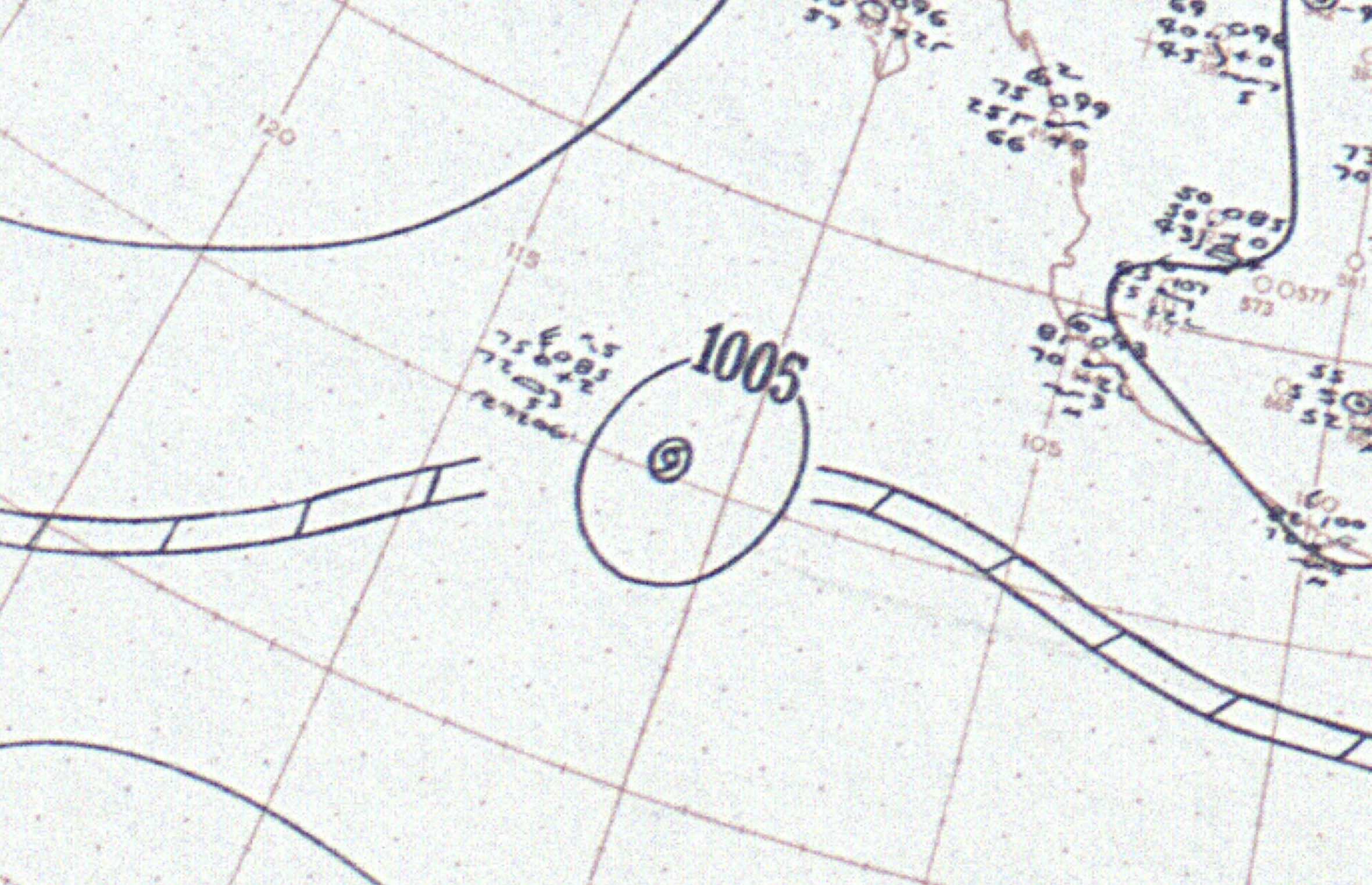
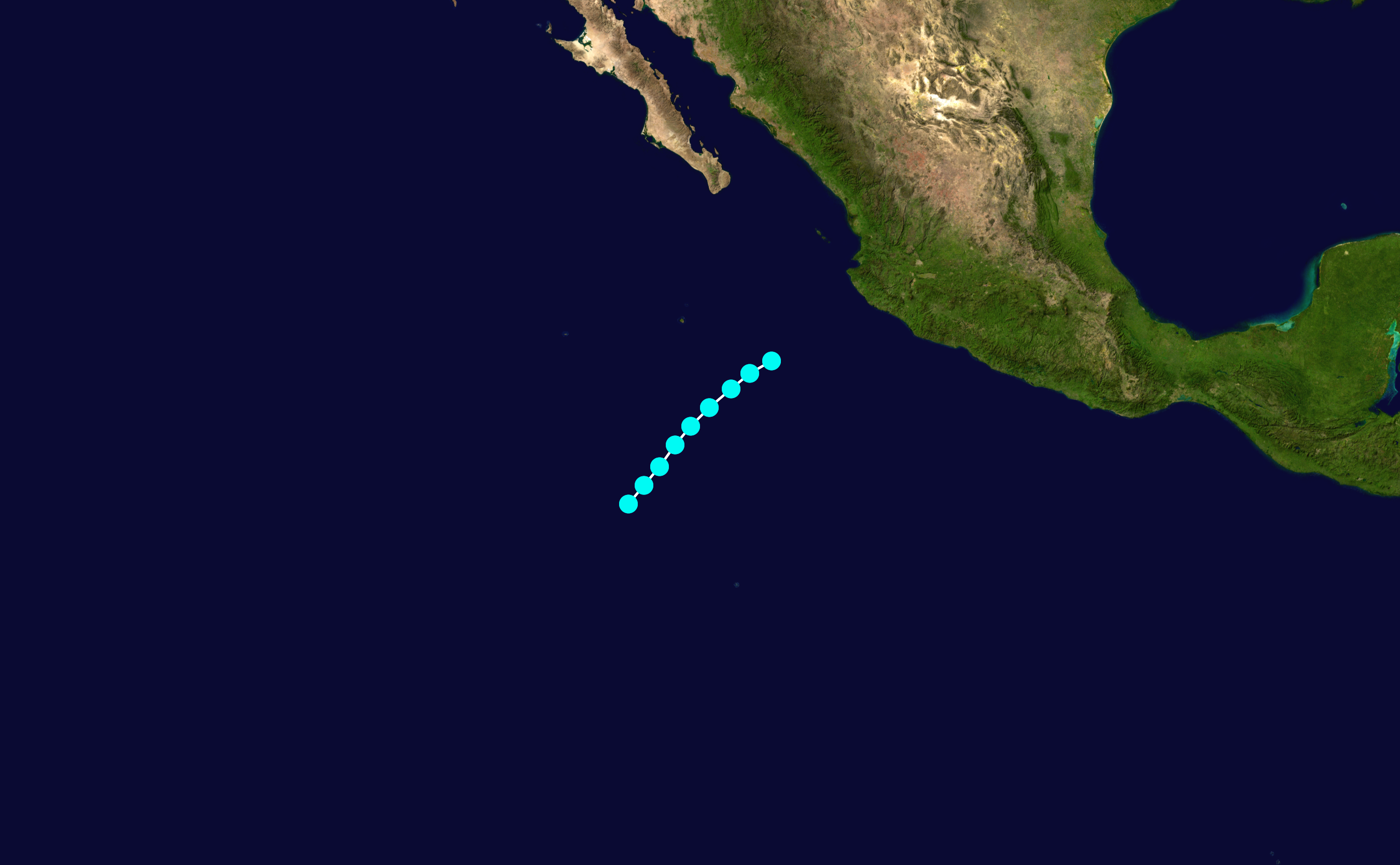
- Duration: May 29 – May 31
- Peak intensity: 50 mph (85 km/h) (1-min);

Tropical Storm One existed from May 29 to May 31.

=== Tropical Storm Two ===
- Tropical storm (SSHWS)
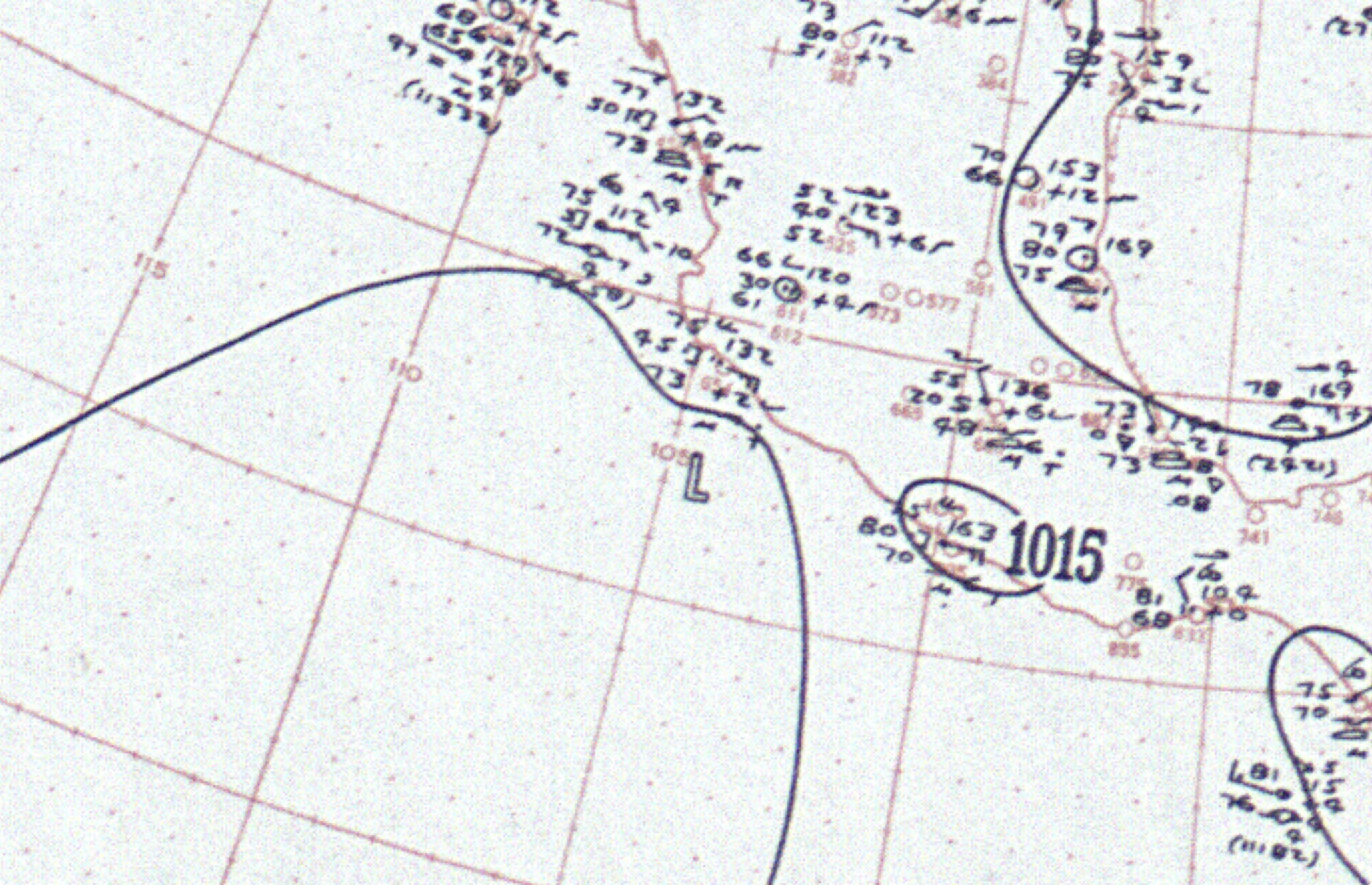
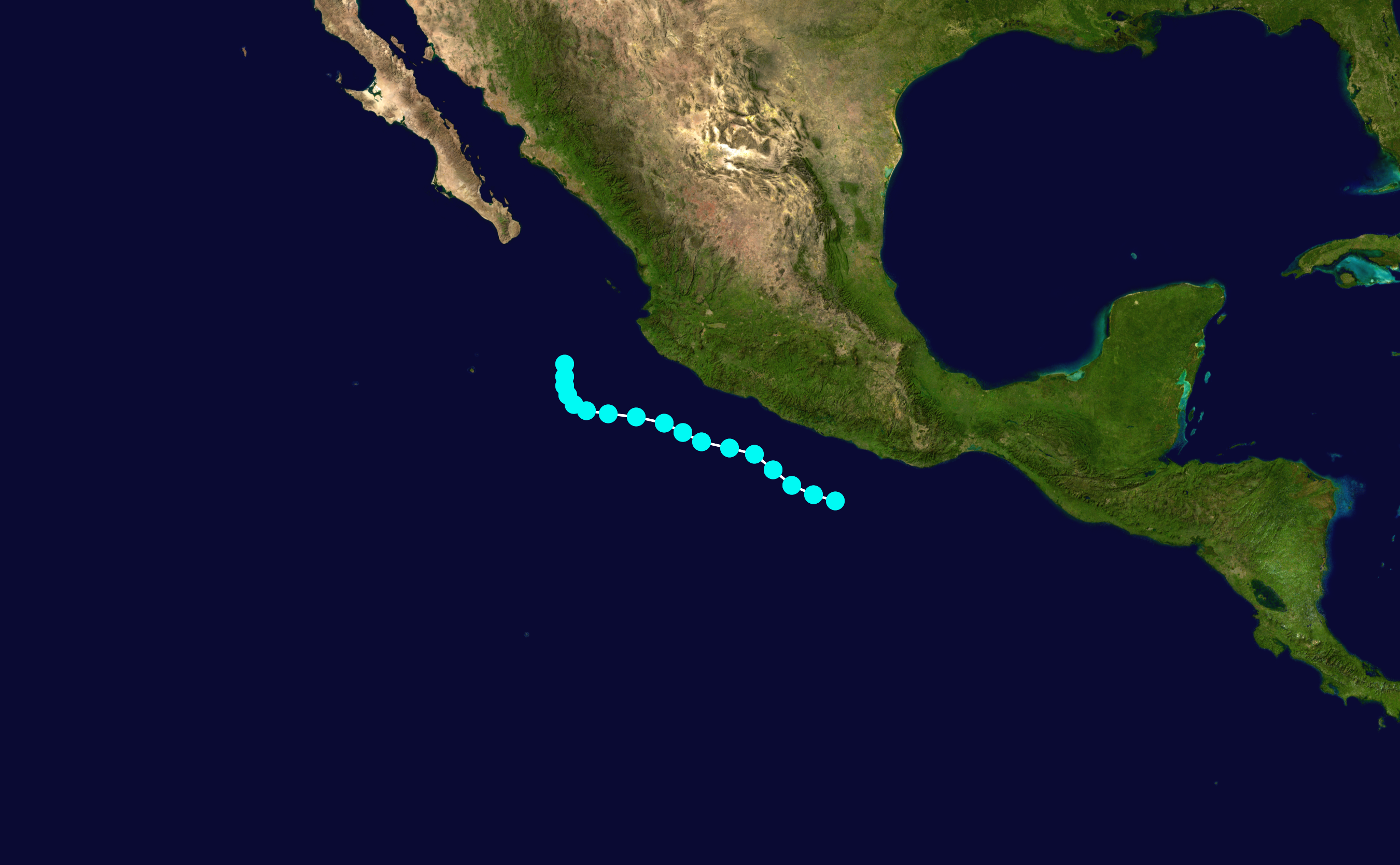
- Duration: June 12 – June 16
- Peak intensity: 50 mph (85 km/h) (1-min);

Tropical Storm Two existed from June 12 to June 16.

=== Tropical Storm Three ===
- Tropical storm (SSHWS)
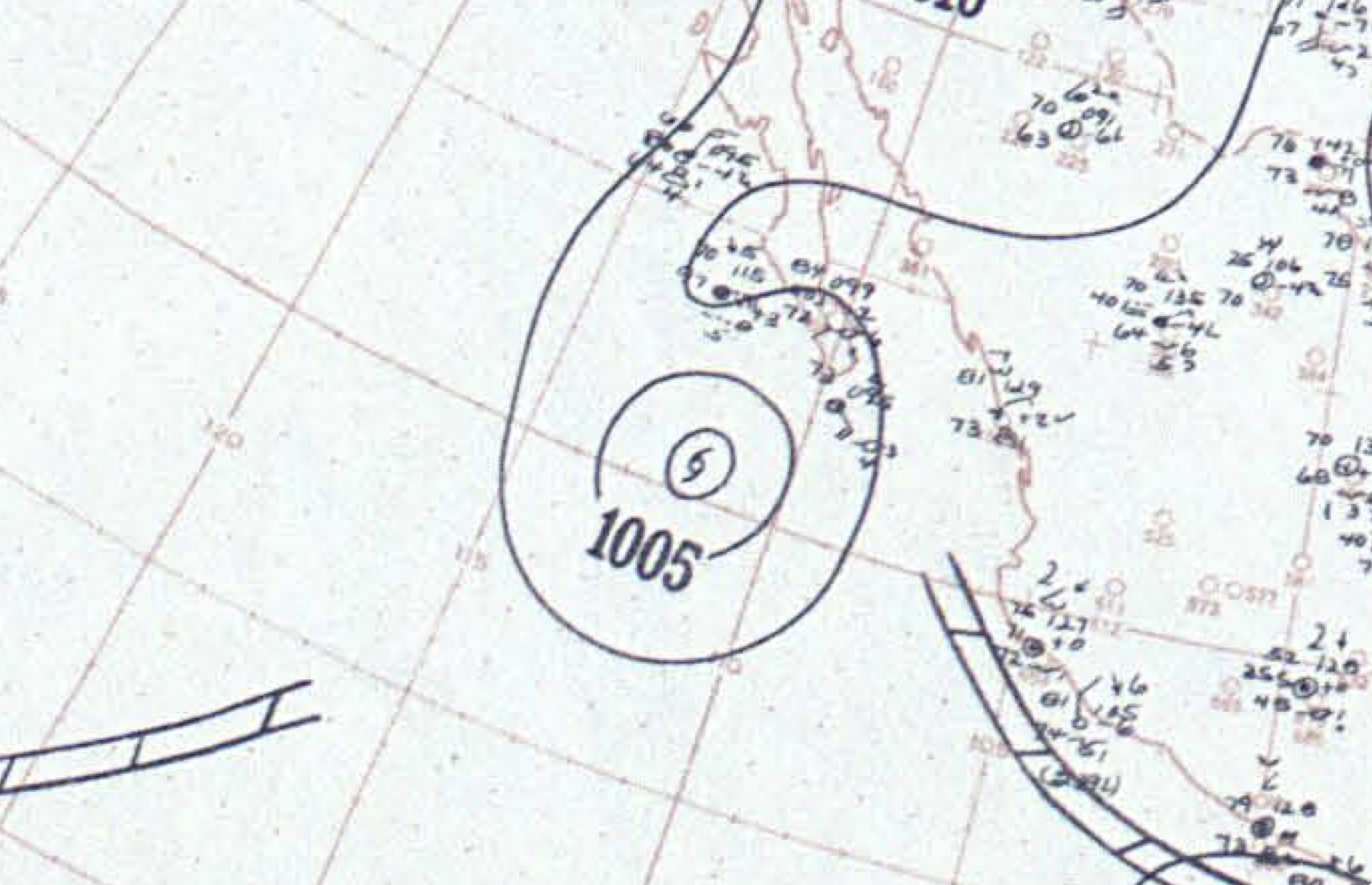
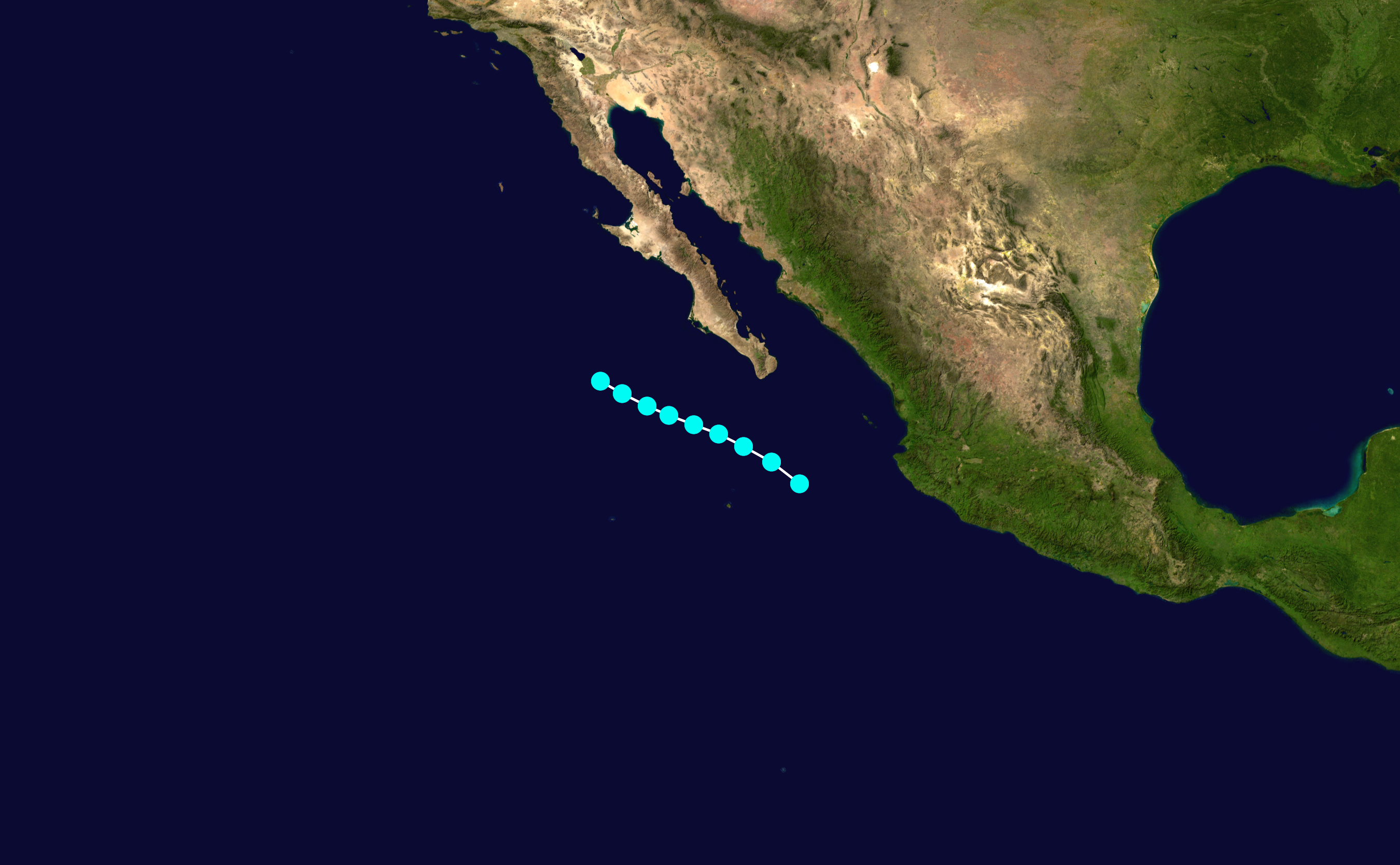
- Duration: July 19 – July 21
- Peak intensity: 50 mph (85 km/h) (1-min);

Tropical Storm Three existed from July 19 to July 21.

=== Hurricane Four ===
- Category 1 hurricane (SSHWS)
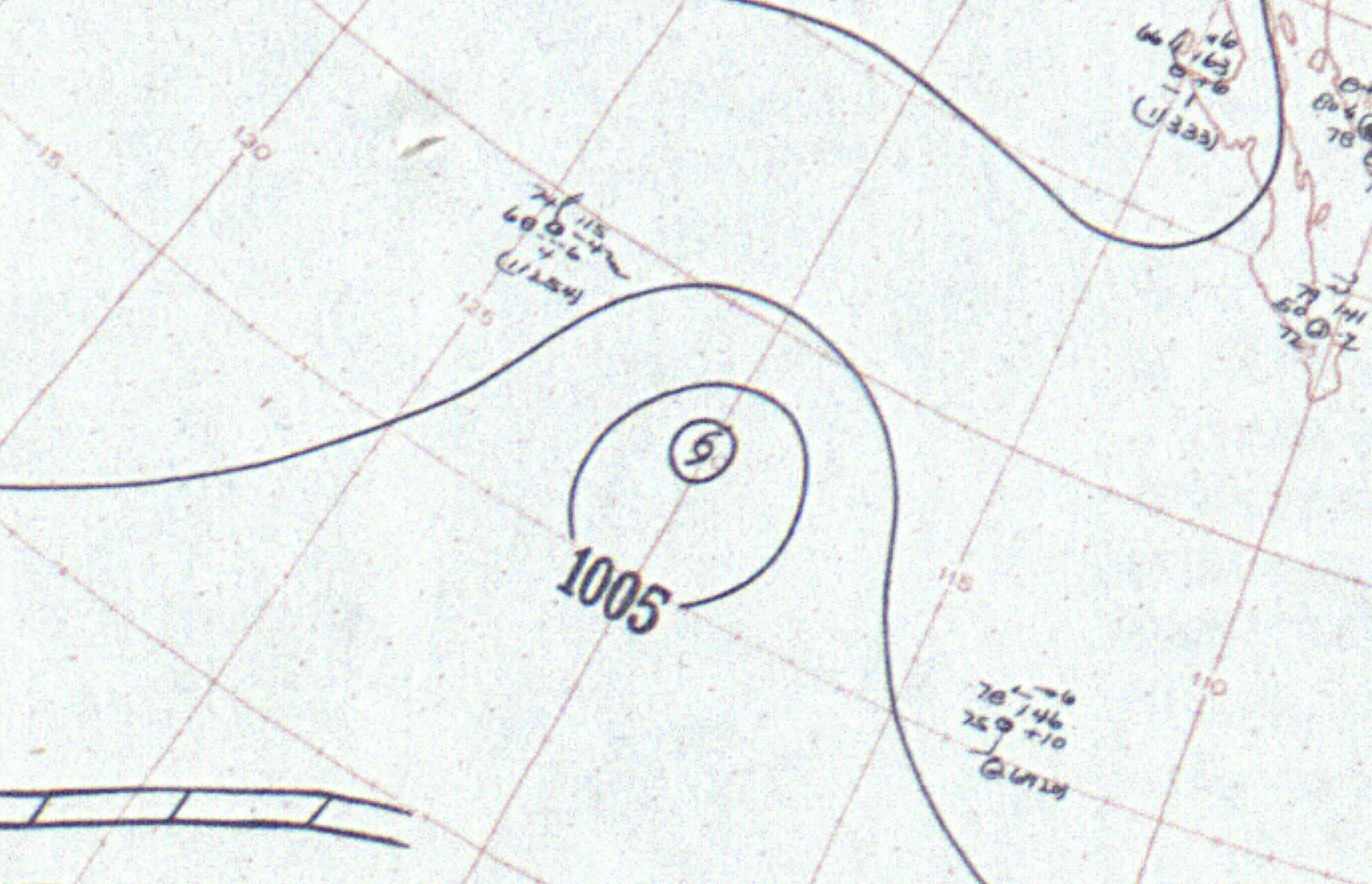
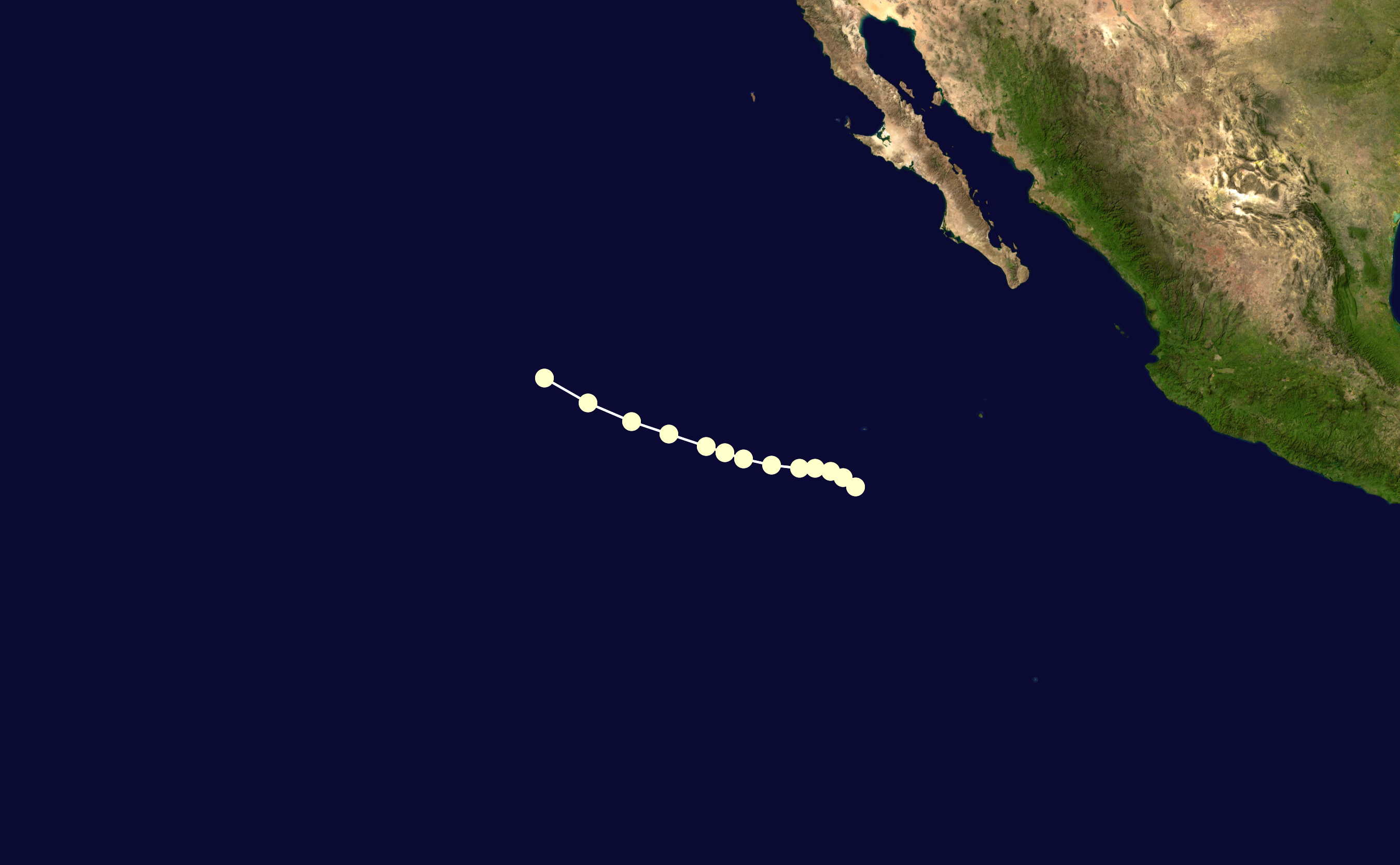
- Duration: July 24 – July 27
- Peak intensity: 80 mph (130 km/h) (1-min);

Hurricane Four remained at sea.

=== Hurricane Five ===
- Category 1 hurricane (SSHWS)
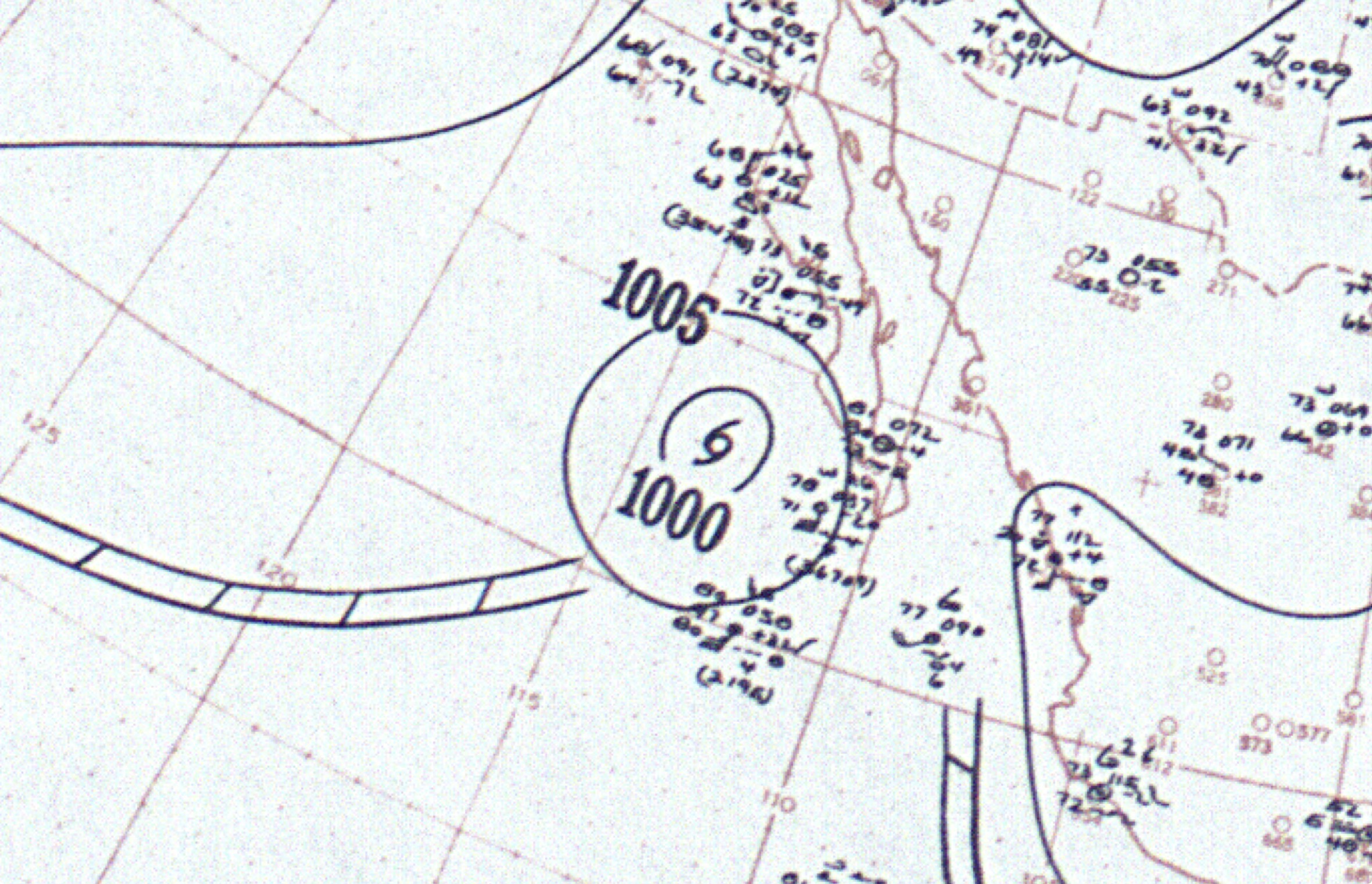
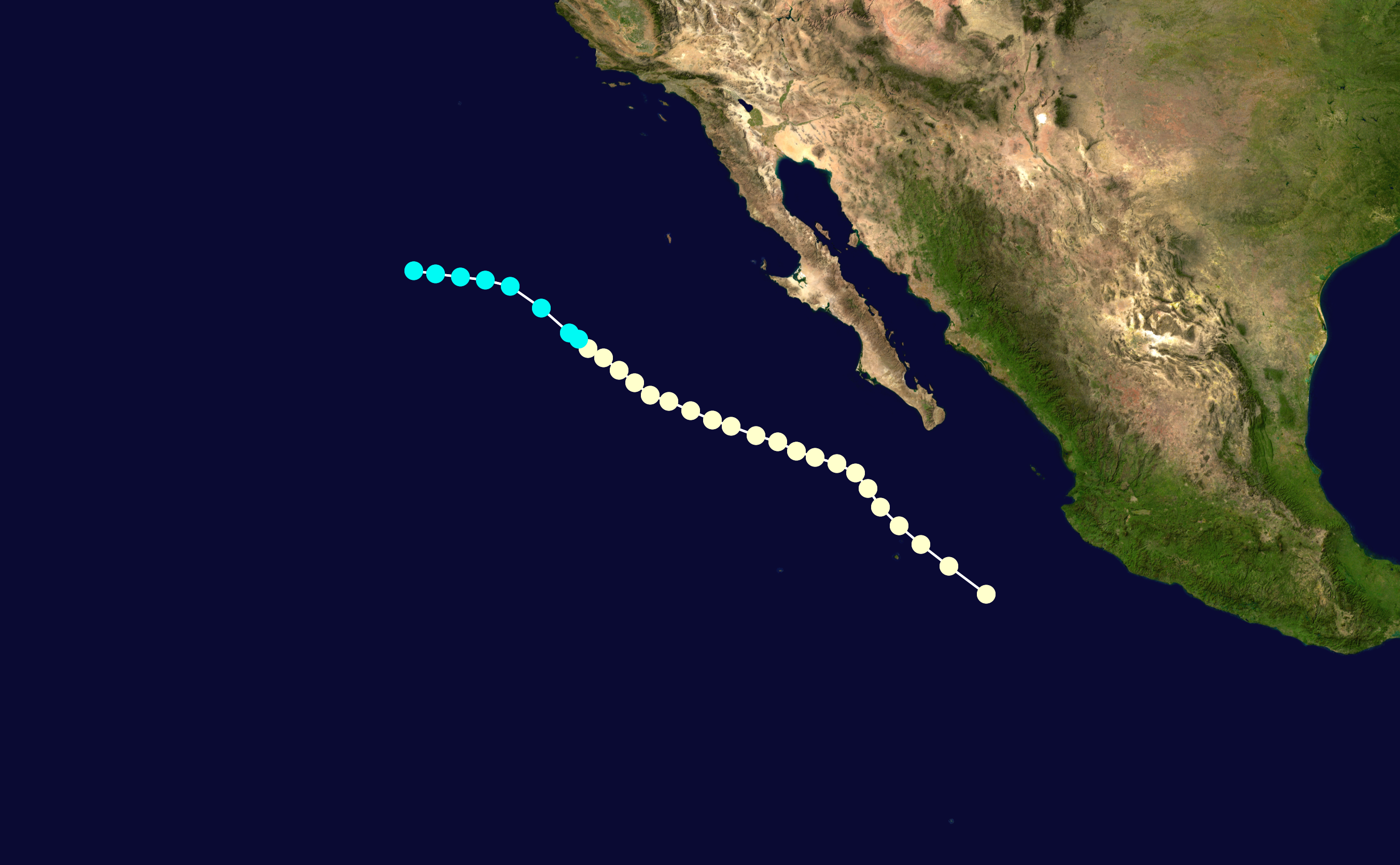
- Duration: September 15 – September 22
- Peak intensity: 85 mph (140 km/h) (1-min);

A hurricane developed on September 15 southwest of Baja California and dissipated seven days later. Moisture from Five produced 2 in (51 mm) of rainfall in the deserts and mountains of central and southern California.

=== Tropical Storm Six ===
- Tropical storm (SSHWS)
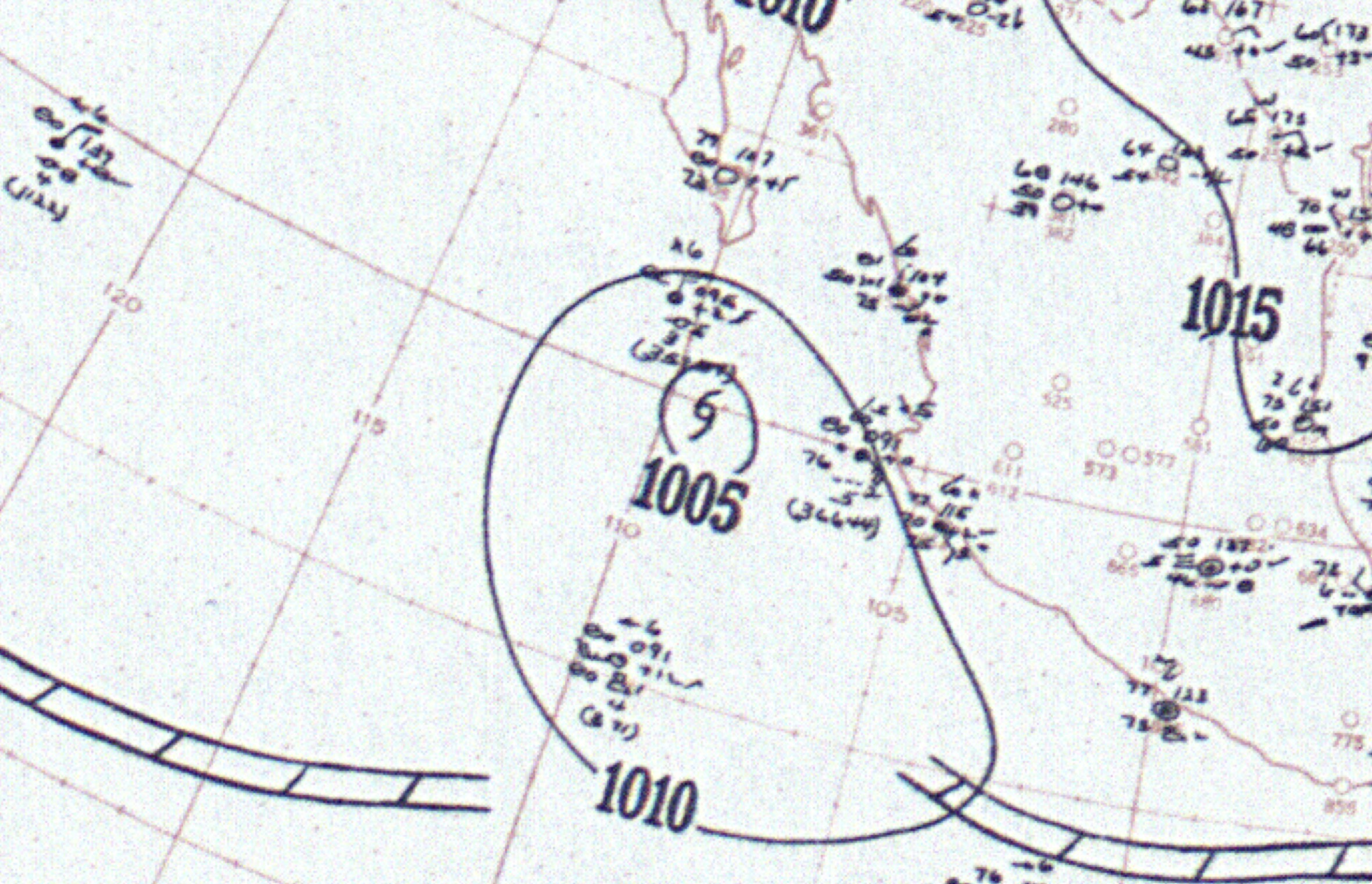
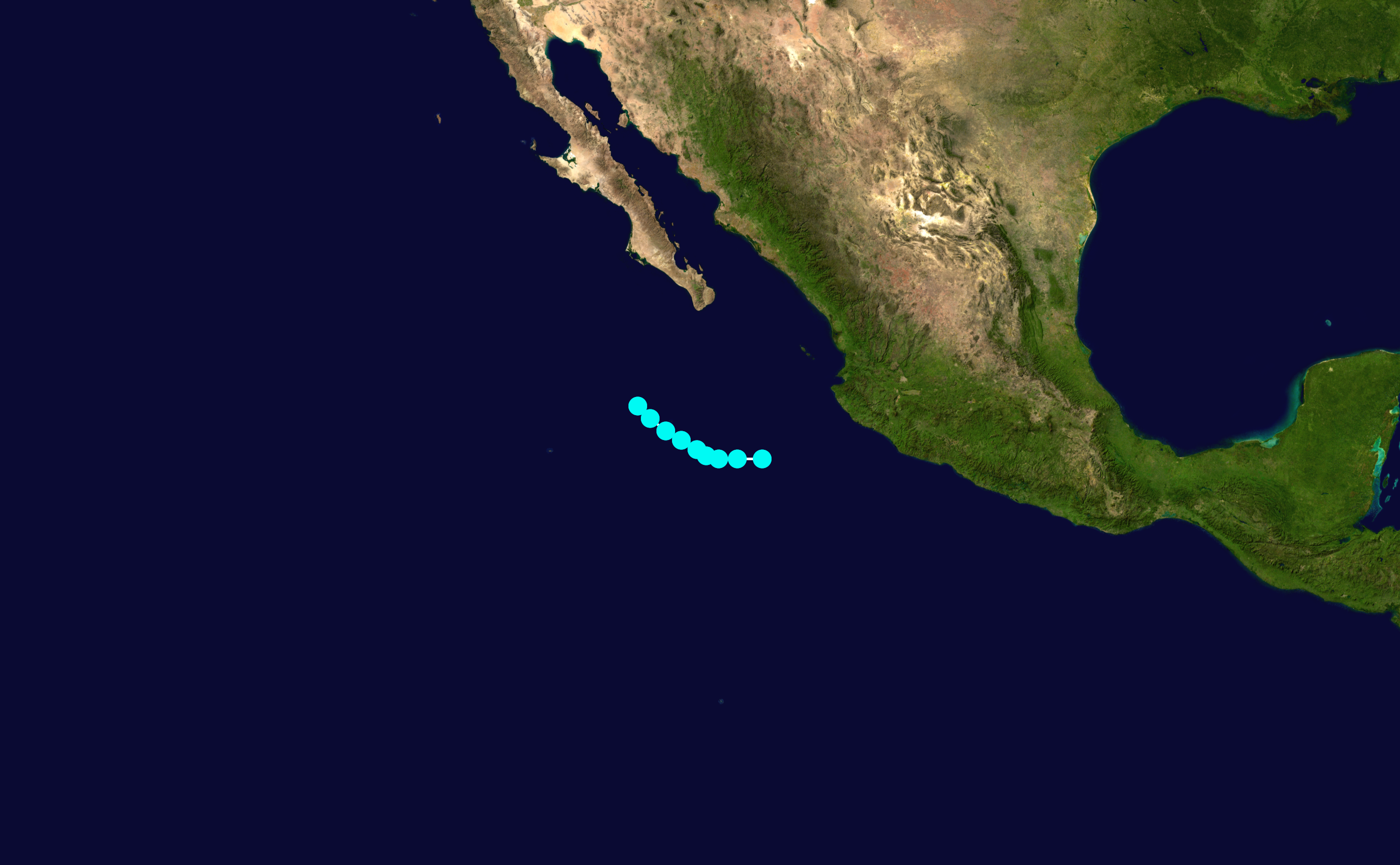
- Duration: September 26 – September 28
- Peak intensity: 50 mph (85 km/h) (1-min);

Tropical Storm Six existed from September 26 to September 28.

=== Hurricane Seven ===
- Category 1 hurricane (SSHWS)
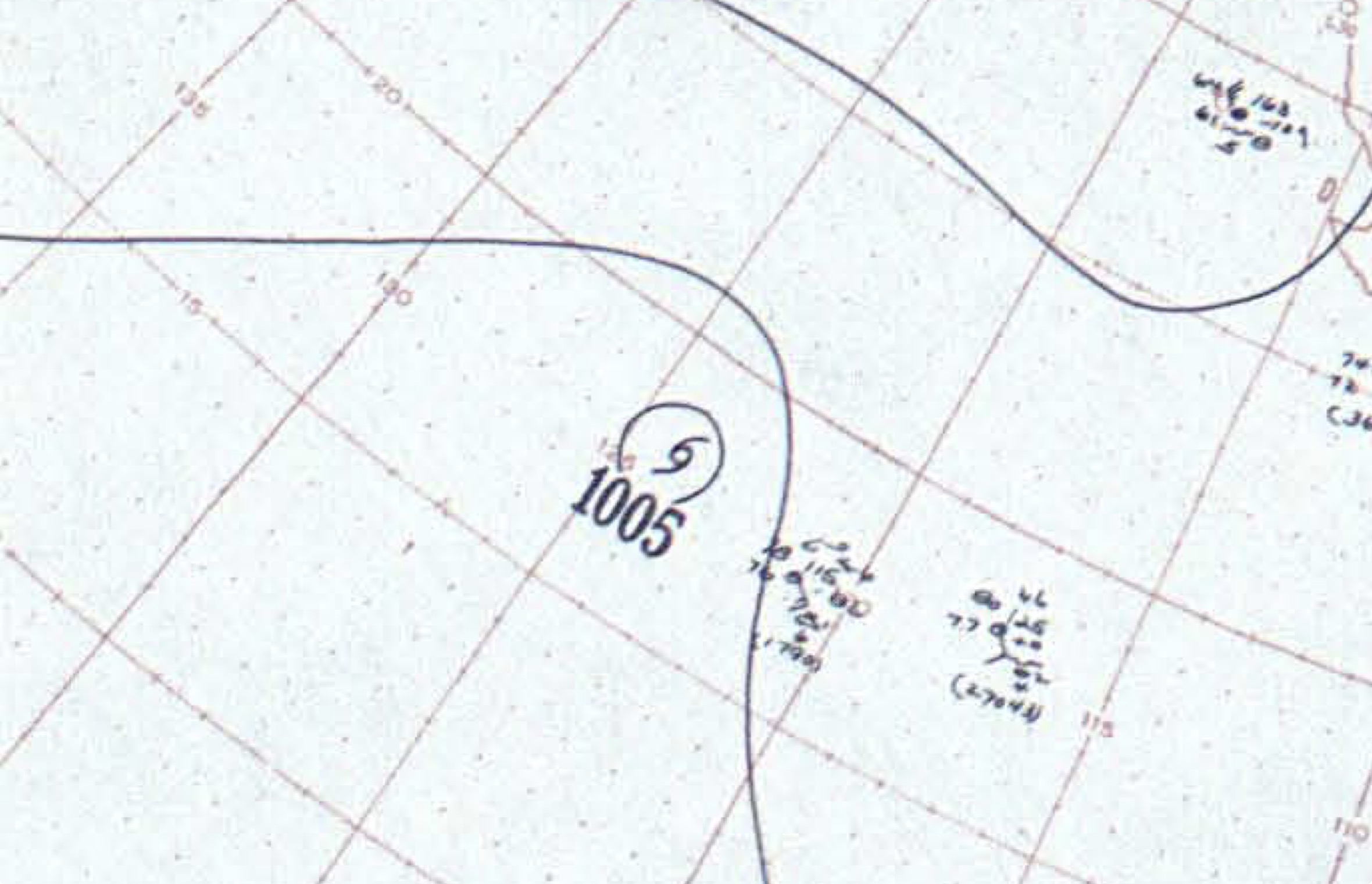
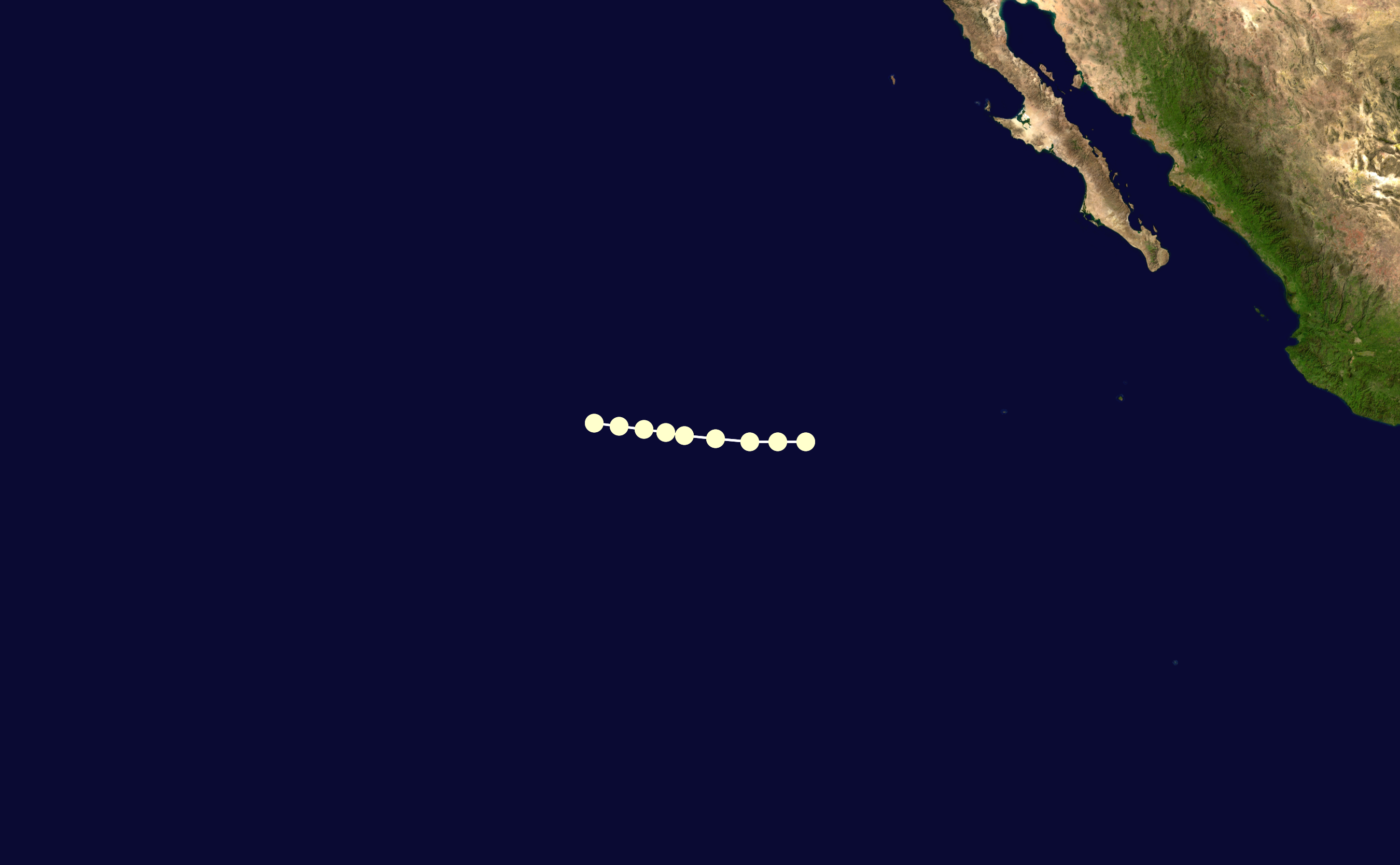
- Duration: October 13 – October 15
- Peak intensity: 85 mph (140 km/h) (1-min);

Hurricane Seven existed from October 13 to October 15.

== See also ==
- List of Pacific hurricanes
- Pacific hurricane season
- 1952 Atlantic hurricane season
- 1952 Pacific typhoon season
- Australian region cyclone seasons: 1952–53 1953–54
- South Pacific cyclone seasons: 1952–53 1953–54
- South-West Indian Ocean cyclone seasons: 1952–53 1953–54
