= Pacific hurricane =

Mature tropical cyclone that develops within the eastern and central Pacific Ocean

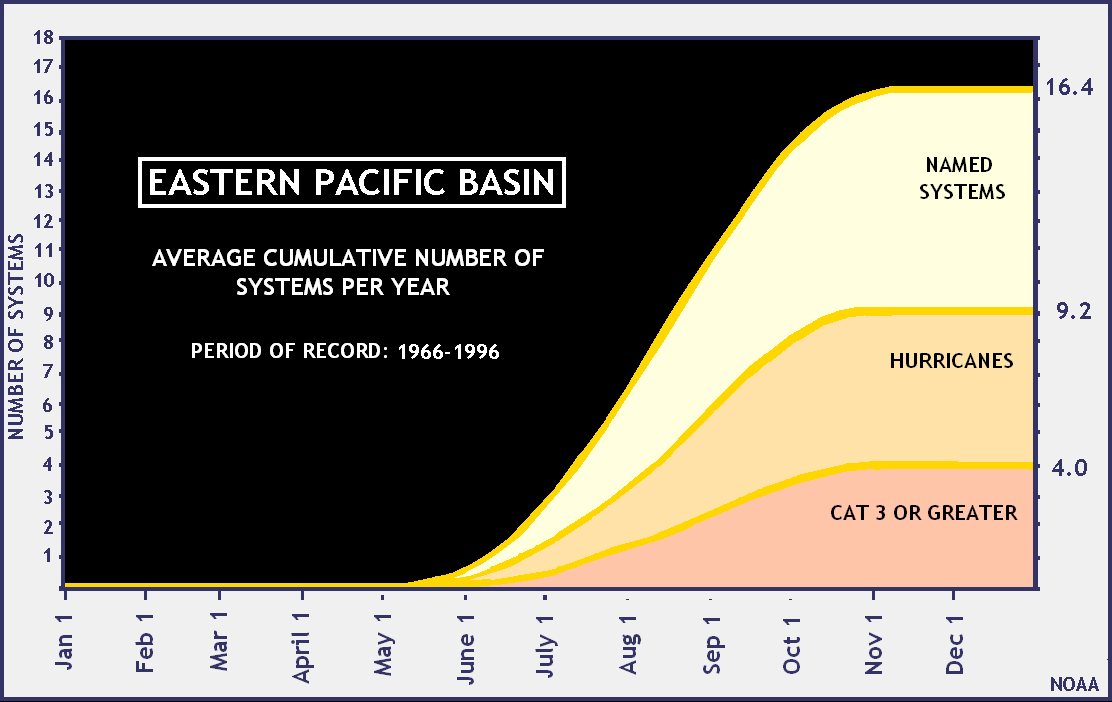
Cumulative average number of tropical cyclones in the eastern north Pacific

A Pacific hurricane is a tropical cyclone that develops in the Pacific Ocean north of the equator, between 180° and the west coast of North America. For tropical cyclone warning purposes, this area is divided into two regions: the Eastern North Pacific basin (North America to 140°W), and the Central North Pacific Basin (140°W to 180°). Identical phenomena in the western north Pacific are called typhoons. This separation between the two basins has a practical convenience, however, as tropical cyclones rarely form in the central north Pacific due to high vertical wind shear, and few cross the dateline.

== Climatology ==
Number of tropical cyclones per day of year over the last 100 years in the eastern Pacific basin.

The presence of a semi-permanent high-pressure area known as the North Pacific High in the eastern Pacific is a dominant factor against the formation of tropical cyclones in the winter, as the Pacific High results in wind shear that causes unfavorable, environmental conditions for tropical cyclone formation. Its effects in the central Pacific basin are usually related to keeping cyclones away from the Hawaiian Islands. Due to westward trade winds, hurricanes in the Pacific rarely head eastward, unless recurved by a trough. A second factor preventing tropical cyclones from forming during the winter is the occupation of a semi-permanent low-pressure area designated the Aleutian Low between January and April. Its presence over western Canada and the northwestern United States contributes to the area's occurrences of precipitation in that duration. In addition, its effects in the central Pacific near 160° W causes tropical waves that form in the area to drift northward into the Gulf of Alaska and dissipate. The retreat of this low allows the Pacific High to also retreat into the central Pacific, leaving a warm and moist environment in its wake. The Intertropical Convergence Zone comes northward into the East Pacific in mid-May permitting the formation of the earliest tropical waves, coinciding with the start of the eastern Pacific hurricane season on May 15.

The El Niño–Southern Oscillation also influences the frequency and intensity of hurricanes in the Northeast Pacific basin. During El Niño events, sea surface temperatures increase in the Northeast Pacific and vertical wind shear decreases. Because of this, an increase in tropical cyclone activity occurs; the opposite happens in the Atlantic basin during El Niño, where increased wind shear creates an unfavorable environment for tropical cyclone formation. Contrary to El Niño, La Niña events increase wind shear and decreases sea surface temperatures over the eastern Pacific, while reducing wind shear and increasing sea surface temperatures over the Atlantic.

In the eastern Pacific, east of 140º W, the hurricane season begins on May 15. In the central Pacific, the season begins on June 1. Across the basin, activity typically peaks in August or September, and the season ends on November 30. The Regional Specialized Meteorological Center for this basin is the United States' National Hurricane Center Previous forecasters are the Eastern Pacific Hurricane Center, Joint Hurricane Warning Center, and Central Pacific Hurricane Center. The RSMC monitors the eastern Pacific and Central Pacific and issues reports, watches and warnings about tropical weather systems and cyclones as defined by the World Meteorological Organization.

This area is, on average, the second-most active basin in the world. There are an average of 16 tropical storms annually, with 9 becoming hurricanes, and 4 becoming major hurricanes.

== History ==
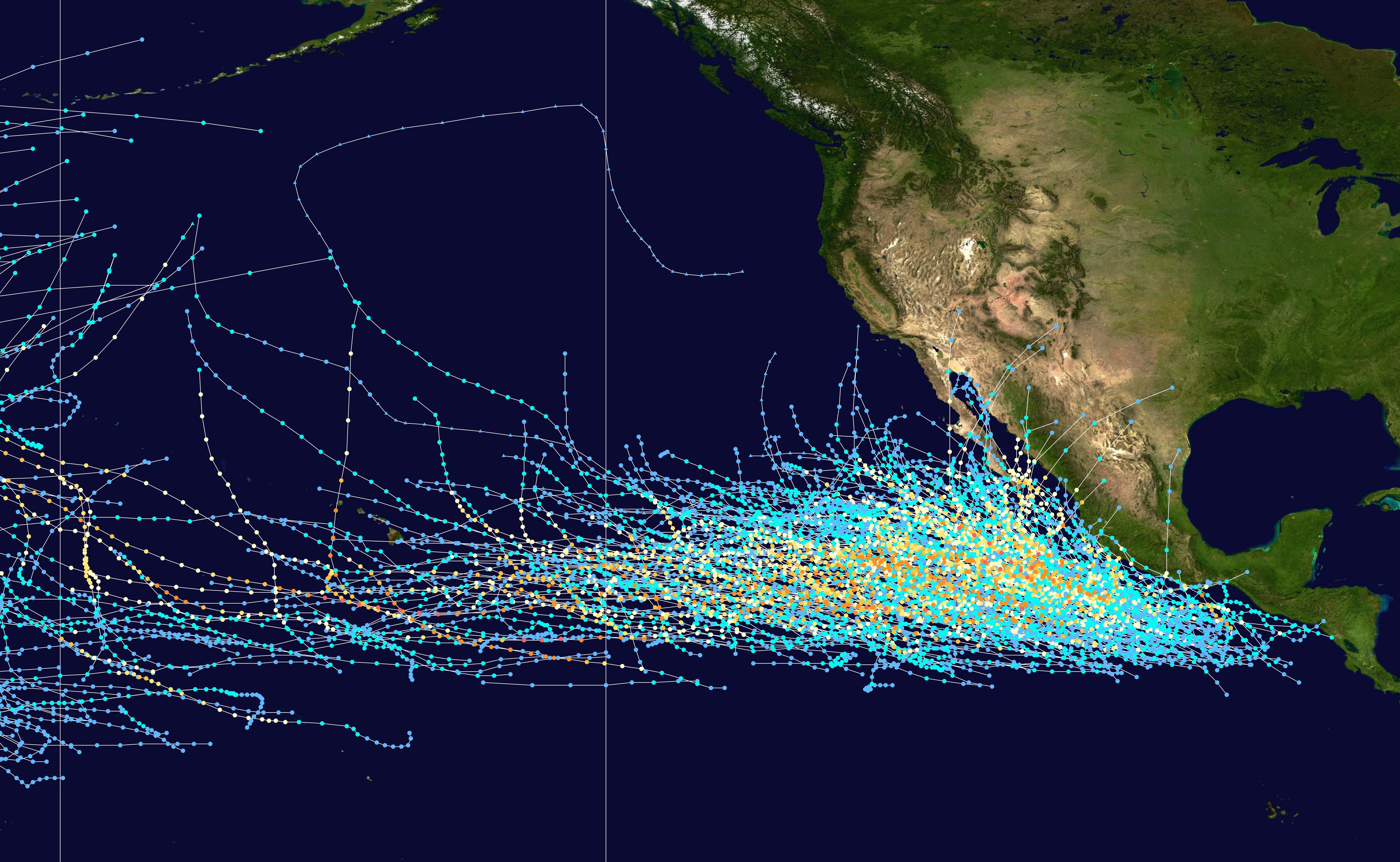
Tracks of East Pacific tropical cyclones (1980–2005)

Documentation of Pacific hurricanes dates to the Spanish colonization of Mexico, when the military and missions wrote about "tempestades". In 1730, such accounts indicated an understanding of the storms. After observing the rotating nature of tropical cyclones, meteorologist William Charles Redfield expanded his study to include storms in the eastern North Pacific Ocean in the middle of the 19th century. Between June and October 1850, Redfield observed five tropical cyclones along "the southwestern coast of North America", along with one in each of the three subsequent years. In 1895, Cleveland Abbe reported the presence of many storms between 5° and 15°–N in the eastern Pacific, although many such storms dissipated before affecting the Mexican coast. Two years later, the German Hydrography Office Deutsche Seewarte documented 45 storms from 1832 to 1892 off the west coast of Mexico.

Despite the documentation of storms in the region, the official position of the United States Weather Bureau denied the existence of such storms. In 1910, the agency reported on global tropical cyclones, noting that "the occurrence of tropical storms is confined to the summer and autumn months of the respective hemispheres and to the western parts of the several oceans." In 1913, the Weather Bureau reinforced their position by excluding Pacific storms among five tropical cyclone basins; however, the agency acknowledged the existence of "certain cyclones that have been traced for a relatively short distance along a northwest course... west of Central America."

After California became a state and the discovery of gold there in 1848, shipping traffic began increasing steadily in the eastern Pacific. Such activity increased further after the Panama Canal opened in 1914, and the shipping lanes moved closer to the coast. By around 1920, Pacific hurricanes were officially recognized due to widespread ship observations, radio service, and a newly created weather network in western Mexico. Within 60 years, further studies of the region's tropical activity indicated that the eastern Pacific is in fact the second most active basin in the world.

During the 1920s, a few documents in the Monthly Weather Review reported additional storms within 2,000 mi (3,200 km) off the Mexican coastline.

== List of seasons ==
Historical storm formation by month between 1990 and 2020
- Category 5
- Category 4
- Category 3
- Category 2
- Category 1
- Tropical storm
- Tropical depression

Period	Seasons
Pre-1920s	Before 1900, 1900s, 1910s
1920s	1920–1924, 1925, 1926, 1927, 1928, 1929
1930s	1930, 1931, 1932, 1933, 1934, 1935, 1936, 1937, 1938, 1939
1940s	1940, 1941, 1942–1948, 1949
1950s	1950, 1951, 1952, 1953, 1954, 1955, 1956, 1957, 1958, 1959
1960s	1960, 1961, 1962, 1963, 1964, 1965, 1966, 1967, 1968, 1969
1970s	1970, 1971, 1972, 1973, 1974, 1975, 1976, 1977, 1978, 1979
1980s	1980, 1981, 1982, 1983, 1984, 1985, 1986, 1987, 1988, 1989
1990s	1990, 1991, 1992, 1993, 1994, 1995, 1996, 1997, 1998, 1999
2000s	2000, 2001, 2002, 2003, 2004, 2005, 2006, 2007, 2008, 2009
2010s	2010, 2011, 2012, 2013, 2014, 2015, 2016, 2017, 2018, 2019
2020s	2020, 2021, 2022, 2023, 2024, 2025, 2026

=== 1950s ===
Year	TD	TS	HU	MH	Strongest storm	Deaths	Damages (USD)	Notes
1950	–	7	6	0	1 Hiki	1	Unknown	Includes Hiki, the third wettest tropical cyclone in the United States.
1951	–	9	2	0	1 Two; 1 Eight	0	Unknown	
1952	–	7	3	0	1 Five; 1 Seven	0	Unknown	
1953	–	4	2	0	TS One	0	Unknown	
1954	11	11	4	0	TS Seven	40	Unknown	
1955	–	6	2	0	1 One	0	Unknown	
1956	–	11	7	0	1 One	0	Unknown	
1957	–	13	9	1	4 Twelve	21	$100,000	
1958	14	14	5	0	1 Eleven	0	Unknown	
1959	15	15	5	3	5 Patsy	>1,800	$280 million	Patsy was the first known category 5 hurricane in the Central Pacific basin. Includes the deadliest tropical cyclone in the Eastern Pacific, the 1959 Mexico hurricane.

=== 1960s ===
Year	TD	TS	HU	MH	Strongest storm	Deaths	Damages (USD)	Notes
1960	8	8	5	0	1 Estelle	0	Unknown	
1961	11	10	2	0	1 Iva	436	$16 million	
1962	18	12	2	0	1 Doreen	Unknown	$11 million	
1963	8	8	4	0	1 Mona	Unknown	Unknown	
1964	6	6	2	0	2 Odessa	Unknown	Unknown	Least active season since 1953.
1965	11	10	1	0	1 Emily	6	$10 million	
1966	18	13	8	0	1 Connie	9+	$5.6 million	Includes the farthest traveled storm in the Eastern Pacific, Blanca.
1967	17	17	6	1	3 Olivia	121	Unknown	
1968	26	20	6	0	1 Rebecca	9	Unknown	Tied with 2009 for having the most storms named in the month of August.
1969	15	10	4	0	1 Doreen	10	Unknown	Includes the latest first-named storm at that time, Ava, which formed in July.

=== 1970s ===
Year	TD	TS	HU	MH	ACE	Strongest storm	Deaths	Damages (USD)	Notes
1970	21	19	5	0		2 Lorraine	22	Unknown	
1971	22	18	12	6	139	3 Olivia	52	$40 million	First year of reliable records in the eastern and central Pacific basins.
1972	20	14	9	4	136	4 Celeste	1	$75,000	
1973	18	12	7	3	114	5 Ava	0	Unknown	Featured the strongest hurricane in the basin at the time and the earliest category 5 in the Eastern Pacific on record. Ava was also the first known category 5 Pacific hurricane east of 140°W.
1974	25	18	11	3	90	4 Maggie	18–33	$4 million	Featured one of the most active periods of tropical cyclones on record with five existing simultaneously (Ione, Joyce, Kirsten, Lorraine, and Maggie).
1975	21	17	9	4	112	4 Denise	30	$20 million	
1976	19	15	9	5	121	4 Annette	614–964	$360 million	
1977	17	8	4	0	22	2 Florence	8	$39.6 million	Least active season in terms of tropical storms, tied with 2010; tied for lowest number of hurricanes until 2010. Featured no major hurricanes, a feat later repeated in 2003.
1978	25	19	14	7	207	4 Fico; 4 Hector; 4 Norman	4	$301 million	First season to use masculine and feminine names.
1979	13	10	6	4	57	4 Ignacio	Unknown	Unknown	Most recent year in which no tropical cyclones crossed into the Central Pacific basin.
Total	201	150	86	36	1110	Ava	767–1,102	≥$385.075 million	

=== 1980s ===
Year	TD	TS	HU	MH	ACE	Strongest storm	Deaths	Damages (USD)	Notes
1980	16	15	7	3	77	4 Kay	0	Unknown	
1981	17	15	8	1	72	3 Norma	79	$134 million	
1982	30	23	12	5	161	4 Olivia	1,937	$1.3 billion	Fifth most active season on record.
1983	26	21	12	8	206	4 Kiko; 4 Raymond	168	$303.33 million	Tied with 1984 for the fourth most active season at the time.
1984	26	21	13	7	193	4 Douglas	21	Unknown	Tied with 1983 for the fourth most active season at the time.
1985	28	24	12	8	192	4 Rick	1	$1 million	Fourth most active season on record. Tied with 2018 and 2025 for the most named storms on record in the month of June. (5); Tied with 2015 and 2016 for the most active month of July since reliable records began.
1986	26	17	9	3	107	4 Roslyn	2	$352 million	
1987	20	20	10	4	132	4 Max	3	$144.22 million	Last year in which the Eastern Pacific Hurricane Center was the primary warning center for tropical cyclones in the eastern Pacific Ocean.
1988	23	15	7	3	127	4 Hector	24	Unknown	Hurricane Joan crossed over Central America and was named Miriam in the Eastern Pacific basin.
1989	25	18	9	4	110	4 Raymond	14	$1.75 million	
Total	237	189	99	46	1377	Max	2,250	≥$2.240 billion	

=== 1990s ===
Year	TD	TS	HU	MH	ACE	Strongest storm	Deaths	Damages (USD)	Notes
1990	27	21	16	6	245	4 Trudy	19	$12.5 million	Fifth most active season on record and third most active in terms of ACE. Tied with 1992, 2014, and 2015 for the most hurricanes in a single season.
1991	16	14	10	5	178	4 Kevin	11	Unknown	
1992	30	27	16	10	295	4 Tina	25	$3.15 billion	Most active Pacific hurricane season on record. Second-most active Pacific hurricane season on record in terms of ACE. Tied with 1990, 2014, and 2015 for the most hurricanes in a single season. Includes the strongest hurricane on record to strike Hawaii, Iniki. Hurricane Ekeka is the most intense off-season hurricane in the Pacific basin. Third costliest Pacific hurricane season on record.
1993	18	15	11	9	201	4 Lidia	50	$40 million	
1994	23	20	10	5	185	5 Gilma	26	$735 million	Tied with 2002 and 2018 for having the most category 5 hurricanes in a single season. Includes the tropical cyclone that travelled the farthest distance on record, Hurricane John. It was also the longest-lasting tropical cyclone ever observed until surpassed by Cyclone Freddy in 2023.
1995	11	10	7	3	100	4 Juliette	124	$31 million	Least active season since 1979.
1996	14	9	5	2	53	4 Douglas	48	$813,000	Tied with 2021 for the most hurricanes to strike Mexico in a single season. Hurricane Cesar crossed over from Central America and was renamed Douglas in the Pacific basin.
1997	24	19	9	7	167	5 Linda	261–531	$551 million	Hurricane Linda was the most intense hurricane in the Pacific basin until Patricia in 2015, and later, Polo in 2026.
1998	16	13	9	6	134	4 Howard	54	$760 million	
1999	14	9	6	2	90	4 Dora	16	None	
Total	193	157	99	55	1,648	Linda	581–853	≥$4.9 billion	

=== 2000s ===
Year	TD	TS	HU	MH	ACE	Strongest storm	Deaths	Damages (USD)	Notes
2000	21	19	6	2	95	4 Carlotta	27	$84 million	
2001	19	15	8	2	90	4 Juliette	13	$401 million	
2002	19	15	8	6	124	5 Kenna	7	$101 million	Tied with 1994 and 2018 for having the most category 5 hurricanes in a single season. Includes the fifth most intense hurricane in the Pacific basin, Kenna.
2003	17	16	7	0	56	2 Nora	23	$129 million	Featured no major hurricanes, tied with 1977.
2004	18	12	6	3	71	4 Javier	0	None	
2005	17	15	7	2	96	4 Kenneth	6	$12 million	
2006	25	19	11	6	155	5 Ioke	14	$355 million	Most active since 2000. Includes the most intense hurricane in the Central Pacific basin, Ioke.
2007	15	11	4	1	52	4 Flossie	42	$80 million	Tied with 1977 for having the lowest number of hurricanes until the 2010 season.
2008	19	17	7	2	83	4 Norbert	45	$153 million	
2009	23	20	8	5	127	5 Rick	16	$226 million	Most active since 1994. Tied with 1968 for having the most storms named in the month of August. Includes the fourth most intense hurricane in the Pacific basin, Rick.
Total	192	159	72	29	949	Rick	193	≥$1.54 billion	

=== 2010s ===
Year	TD	TS	HU	MH	ACE	Strongest storm	Deaths	Damages (USD)	Notes
2010	13	8	3	2	51	5 Celia	268	$1.62 billion	Least active Pacific hurricane season on record, tied with 1977. Record low number of hurricanes (3). Includes a Category 5 hurricane in the basin, Celia. Includes a rare off-season in December, Omeka.
2011	13	11	10	6	120.9	4 Dora	49	>$204 million	
2012	17	17	10	5	98.5	4 Emilia	8	$28 million	
2013	21	20	9	1	74.9	3 Raymond	183	$4.47 billion	Second costliest Pacific hurricane season on record. Most recent to have fewer than two major hurricanes.
2014	23	22	16	9	202.4	5 Marie	50	>$2.09 billion	Fourth most active season on record. Tied with 1990, 1992, and 2015 for the most hurricanes in a single season.
2015	31	26	16	11	290.6	5 Patricia	45	$588 million	Second most active season on record. Includes the most intense hurricane in the Pacific basin, Patricia. Tied with 1990, 1992, and 2014 for the most hurricanes in a single season. Tied with 1985 and 2016 for the most active month of July since reliable records began. Latest ending to a season on record.
2016	23	22	13	6	184.8	4 Seymour	18	$95.8 million	Earliest start on record in the Pacific basin. Fourth most active season on record. Tied with 1985 and 2015 for the most active month of July since reliable records began. Agatha was the latest forming first-named storm on record in the Eastern Pacific since reliable records began.
2017	20	18	9	4	100.8	4 Fernanda	45	$377.28 million	
2018	26	23	13	10	318	5 Walaka	59	>$1.64 billion	Fourth-most active season on record. Second-most active Pacific hurricane season on record in terms of ACE. Tied with 1985 and 2025 for the most named storms on record in the month of June (5). Tied with 1994, 2002, and 2026 for having the most Category 5 hurricanes in a single season.
2019	21	19	7	4	97.6	4 Barbara	12	$212 million	Third-latest first named storm since reliable records began in 1971. No hurricanes formed in August for the first time since 1973.
Total	208	186	106	58	1539.5	Patricia	737	≥$11.3 billion	

=== 2020s ===
Year	TD	TS	HU	MH	ACE	Strongest storm	Deaths	Damages (USD)	Notes
2020	21	17	4	3	77.3	4 Marie	47	>$301.4 million	First season in a string of four in which no tropical cyclones formed in the Central Pacific basin. Lowest amount of hurricanes since 2010; Second-lowest overall tied with 1977 and 2007. Featured one unnamed tropical storm which was operationally classified as a tropical depression.
2021	19	19	8	2	94.5	4 Felicia	13	>$431 million	Earliest start to a season east of 140°E on record, second earliest fifth named storm on record. Second consecutive in which no tropical cyclones formed in the Central Pacific basin. First season in a row to have at least five systems make landfall in Mexico.
2022	19	19	10	4	114.6	4 Darby	33	>$446.61 million	Featured two tropical cyclones that crossed over from the Atlantic (Bonnie and Julia). Third consecutive season in which no tropical cyclones formed in the Central Pacific basin. Second season in a row to have at least five systems make landfall.
2023	20	17	10	8	165.9	5 Otis	>67	>$13.12 billion	Costliest Pacific hurricane season on record. Adrian was the second-latest forming first-named storm on record in the Eastern Pacific since reliable records began. Fourth and final consecutive season in which no tropical cyclones formed in the Central Pacific basin. Featured Hurricanes Jova and Otis, two of the fastest intensifying Pacific hurricanes on record. Otis was also the first Pacific hurricane to make landfall at Category 5 intensity. Tied with 1992 for the most named storms in October. Second season on record (after 1997) to have two named storms get retired in the same year, and first on record to have two retired names east of 140°W (Dora and Otis).
2024	15	14	5	3	84.9	5 Kristy	31	>$2.46 billion	Latest start to a Pacific hurricane season on record. Hone became the first Central Pacific basin-named storm since Ema in 2019. Least active season since 2011. Fourth costliest Pacific hurricane season on record. Third time in which a second consecutive year had at least one Category 5 hurricane (Kristy); Featured one unnamed tropical storm which was operationally classified as a tropical depression.
2025	20	20	11	5	127.3	4 Erick	46	>$411 million	Erick became the earliest major landfall on record along the coast of Mexico. Iona became the first major hurricane named in the Central Pacific since Walaka in 2018. Highest number of hurricanes since 2018. Tied with 1985 and 2018 for the most named storms on record during the month of June (5). First season on record to have six named storms form before July. First 20 named storms since 2018 Pacific hurricane season.
2026	26	25	13	11	359.5	5 Polo	41	>$200 million	Third most active season on record. Highest accumulated cyclone energy on record for a Pacific hurricane season. First season to have at least three Category 5 hurricanes since 2018. Lala became the first hurricane to make a direct impact (not landfall) on the island of Hawaii since 1871. Tied with 1994, 2002, and 2018 for most amount of Category 5 hurricanes in a season. Hurricane Polo became the second-most powerful tropical cyclone in the basin after Hurricane Patricia.
Total	140	131	61	36	1024	Polo	278	≥$17.2 billion	

== The Eastern and Central Pacific hurricane database ==
The Eastern Pacific hurricane best track database was initially compiled on magnetic tape in 1976 for the seasons between 1949 and 1975, at the NHC to help with the development of two tropical cyclone forecast models, which required tracks of past cyclones as a base for its predictions. The database was based on records held by the United States Navy and were interpolated from 12 hourly intervals to 6 hourly intervals based on a scheme devised by Hiroshi Akima in 1970. Initially tracks for the Central Pacific region and tracks for tropical depressions that did not develop into tropical storms or hurricanes were not included within the database. After the database had been created Arthur Pike of the NHC made some internal adjustments, while in 1980 a review was made by Arnold Court under contract from the United States National Weather Service and resulted in additions and/or modifications to 81 tracks in the database. Between 1976 and 1987, the NHC archived best track data from the Eastern Pacific Hurricane Center (EPHC), and in 1982 started including information on Central Pacific tropical storms and hurricanes started to be included in the database based on data from the Joint Typhoon Warning Center and research done by Samuel Shaw of the Central Pacific Hurricane Center (CPHC) in 1981.

The format of the database was completely revised by the NHC during 1984, so that the format could resemble the Atlantic database before they took over the warning responsibility from the EPHC for the Eastern Pacific during 1988. During 2008 and 2013 several revisions were made to the database to extend tracks in land, based on reports in the Mariners Weather Log and extrapolation of the tracks since the EPHC stopped issuing advisories on systems before they made landfall. The archives format was significantly changed during 2013 to include non-synoptic best track times, non-developing tropical depressions and wind radii. During February 2016, the NHC released the 1959 Mexico hurricane's reanalysis, which was the first system to be reassessed, using methods developed for the Atlantic reanalysis process.

== Extremes ==
- The strongest recorded Pacific hurricane was Hurricane Patricia (2015), with 1-minute maximum sustained winds of 215 mph (345 km/h) and a minimum barometric pressure of 872 mbar (hPa; 25.75 inHg). This ranks Patricia as the strongest tropical cyclone globally in terms of 1-minute sustained winds and the second strongest globally in terms of barometric pressure.
- Hurricane John (1994) was the farthest-travelling tropical cyclone worldwide, traversing 7,165 mi (13,280 km) in 30 days and 18 hours.
- The 1959 Mexico hurricane was the deadliest Pacific hurricane, causing 1,800 fatalities mostly in Colima and Jalisco.
- There is only one recorded case of a Pacific system reaching California as a hurricane in almost 200 years of observations—the 1858 San Diego Hurricane.

== See also ==
- Atlantic hurricane
- Cordonazo wind
- Tropical cyclone
- Typhoon
- Atlantic hurricane season
- Pacific typhoon climatology
- Pacific typhoon season
- North Indian Ocean tropical cyclone season
- South-West Indian Ocean tropical cyclone season
- Australian region tropical cyclone season
- South Pacific tropical cyclone season
- South Atlantic tropical cyclone
- Mediterranean tropical-like cyclone
- List of Pacific hurricane records
