= 2025 Pacific hurricane season =

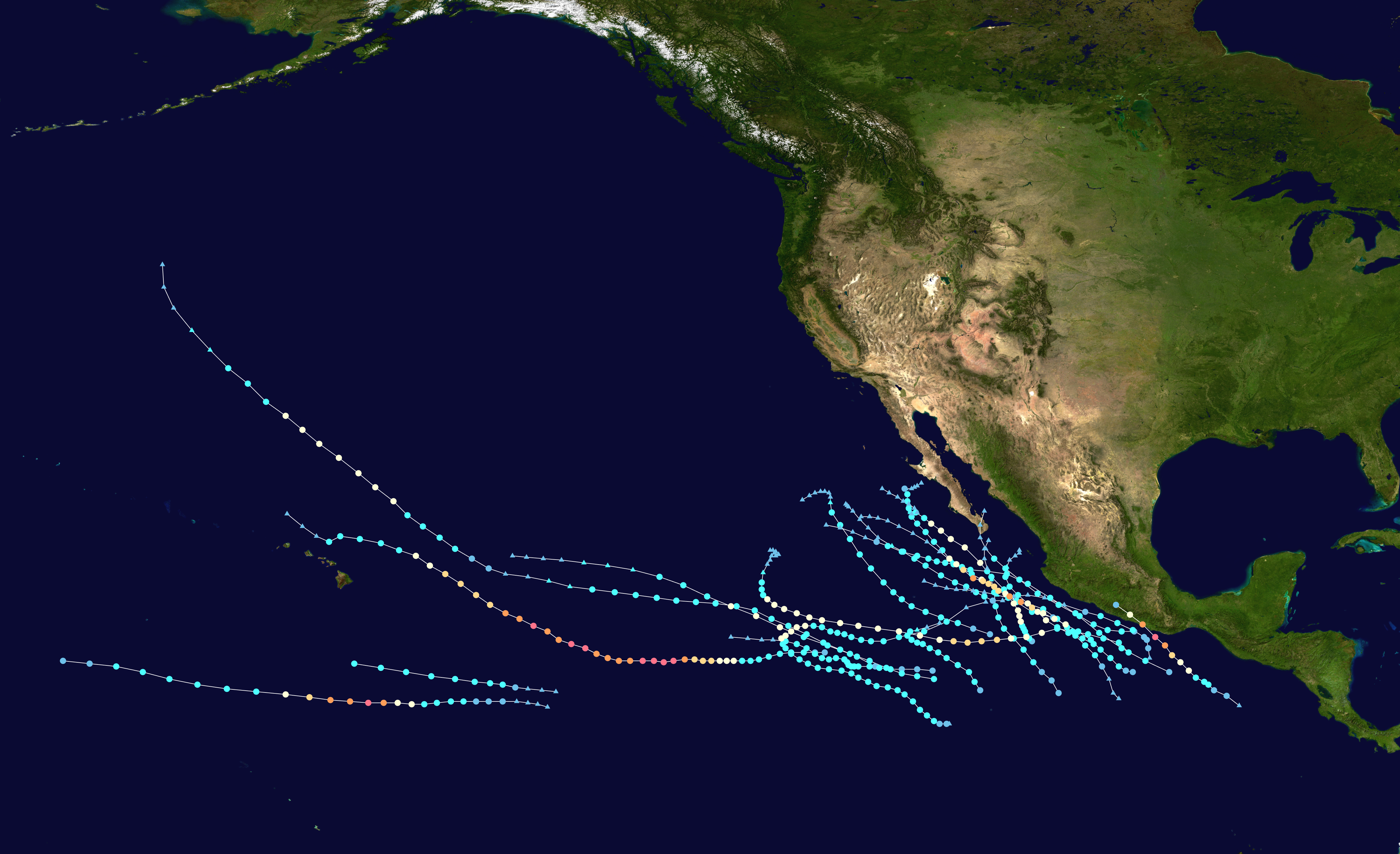
- Season summary map

Seasonal boundaries
- First system formed: May 28, 2025
- Last system dissipated: October 28, 2025

Strongest storm
- By maximum sustained winds: Kiko
  - Maximum winds: 145 mph (230 km/h) (1-minute sustained)
  - Lowest pressure: 945 mbar (hPa; 27.91 inHg)
- By central pressure: Erick
  - Maximum winds: 140 mph (220 km/h) (1-minute sustained)
  - Lowest pressure: 944 mbar (hPa; 27.88 inHg)

Seasonal statistics
- Total depressions: 20
- Total storms: 20
- Hurricanes: 11
- Major hurricanes (Cat. 3+): 5
- ACE: 127.3
- Total fatalities: 45 total
- Total damage: > $439 million (2025 USD)

Related articles
- Timeline of the 2025 Pacific hurricane season; 2025 Atlantic hurricane season; 2025 Pacific typhoon season; 2025 North Indian Ocean cyclone season

The 2025 Pacific hurricane season was the first to see twenty named storms since 2018. It was an active Pacific hurricane season with an above average number of tropical cyclones, largely due to warmer than average sea surface temperatures off the western coast of Mexico. In the Eastern Pacific basin (east of 140°W), 18 named storms formed; 11 of those became hurricanes, of which 4 strengthened into major hurricanes. (Note: Hurricanes reaching Category 3 and higher—1-minute sustained winds higher than 110 miles per hour (178 km/h)—on the Saffir–Simpson scale are described as major hurricanes.) In the Central Pacific basin (between 140°W and the International Date Line), two named storms formed; one of which strengthened into a major hurricane. Additionally, two systems entered into the basin from the east. Collectively, the season had an above-normal accumulated cyclone energy (ACE) value of approximately 127.3 units. The season officially began on May 15, 2025 in the Eastern Pacific, and on June 1 in the Central Pacific; both ended on November 30. These dates, adopted by convention, historically describe the period in each year when most tropical cyclogenesis occurs in these regions of the Pacific.

In contrast to the previous season, which was the latest starting Pacific hurricane season on record in the satellite era, there were several early season storms this year. Tropical Storm Alvin was the first system of the season. It formed off the coast of southern Mexico on May 28, and impacted western Mexico. It was followed by five systems in June, two of which became major hurricanes. Tropical Storm Dalila caused significant flooding in Mexico while passing offshore. Hurricane Erick became the earliest major hurricane to make landfall on either coast of Mexico (Pacific or Atlantic). Erick caused at least US$350 million in damage and 24 fatalities in southwestern Mexico. It was followed by Hurricane Flossie, which passed near the coast of southwestern Mexico, resulting in flooding and property damage. In August, Tropical Storm Ivo brought strong winds and heavy rain to parts of Mexico. In September, Hurricane Lorena, Tropical Storm Mario, and Hurricane Narda brought similar effects to the same region. Then, in October, remnant moisture from Hurricane Priscilla and Tropical Storm Raymond contributed to floods and landslides in several Mexican states and brought heavy rainfall to the Southwestern United States. The last storm of the season, Tropical Storm Sonia, dissipated on October 28, with no further storms forming in November. Despite the level of activity, this was the first Pacific hurricane season since 2022 to not feature a Category 5 hurricane.

== Seasonal forecasts ==
Record		Named storms	Hurricanes	Major hurricanes	Ref
Average (1991–2020):		15.4	8.3	4.2	
Record high activity:		27	16†	11†	
Record low activity:		8†	3	0†	
Date	Source	Named storms	Hurricanes	Major hurricanes	Ref
May 7, 2025	SMN	16–20	8–11	4–6	
May 22, 2025	NOAA	12–18	5–10	2–5	
Area		Named storms	Hurricanes	Major hurricanes	Ref
Actual activity:	EPAC	18	10	4	
Actual activity:	CPAC	2	1	1	
Actual combined activity:		20	11	5	
† Most recent of several such occurrences (See also)

In advance of each Pacific hurricane season, forecasts of hurricane activity are issued by forecasters from the United States National Oceanic and Atmospheric Administration (NOAA)'s Climate Prediction Center, and Mexico's Servicio Meteorológico Nacional (SMN). The forecasts include weekly and monthly changes in significant factors that help determine the amount of tropical storms, hurricanes, and major hurricanes within a particular season.

According to NOAA, the average Pacific hurricane season between 1991 and 2020 contained about 15 named storms, 8 hurricanes and 4 major hurricanes (Category 3 and higher), as well as an accumulated cyclone energy (ACE) index of 80–115 units. Broadly speaking, ACE is the measure of the power of a tropical or subtropical cyclone multiplied by the length of time it existed. ACE is only calculated for full advisories on specific tropical or subtropical cyclones reaching wind speeds of 39 mph (63 km/h) or higher. NOAA typically describes a season as above-average, average, or below-average depending on the cumulative ACE index, but the number of tropical storms, hurricanes or major hurricanes can also be considered.

On May 7, 2025, SMN issued its first outlook for the Pacific hurricane season, forecasting an above average season with 16–20 named storms, 8–11 hurricanes, and 4–6 major hurricanes. On May 22, NOAA released its outlook for the eastern Pacific, which calls for a near-average season with 12 to 18 named storms, 5 to 10 hurricanes, and 2 to 5 major hurricanes, citing a continued neutral phase, the unlikelihood of an El Niño, and the possibility of La Niña in the summer. This increases vertical wind shear in the basin and slightly reduces sea surface temperatures, thus favoring mild to moderate tropical cyclone activity. Furthermore, many global computer models predicted a negative Pacific decadal oscillation (PDO), a phase of a multi-decadal cycle that favored the continuation of much warmer-than-average sea surface temperatures, which had been occurring since 2021, unlike the 1991-2020 period, which generally featured below-normal activity.

== Seasonal summary ==
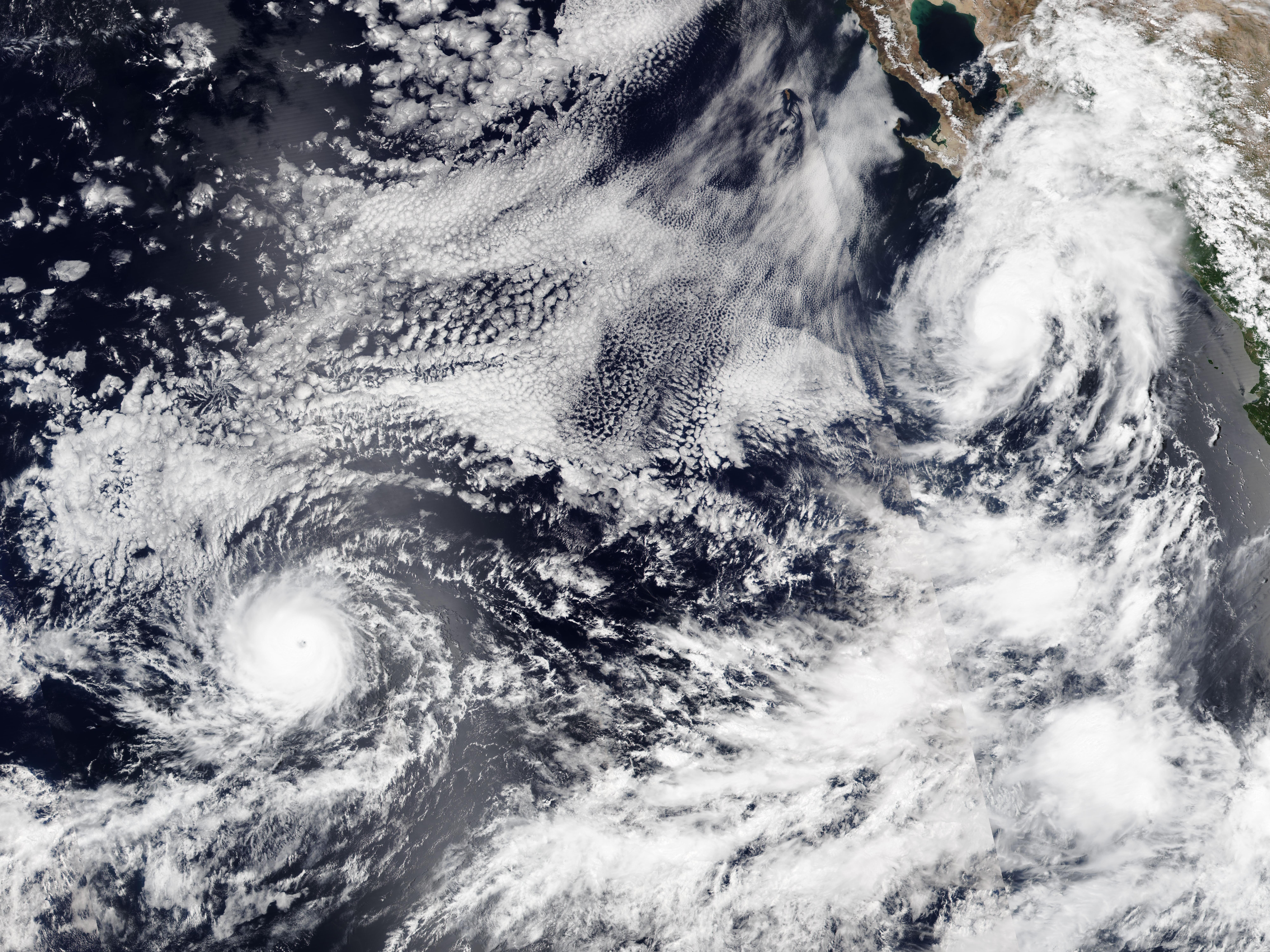
Two simultaneous tropical systems, Hurricane Kiko (left), and Tropical Storm Lorena (right) near the Baja California peninsula, on September 3

Officially, the 2025 Pacific hurricane season began on May 15 in the Eastern Pacific, on June 1 in the Central Pacific, and both ended on November 30. Altogether, twenty tropical cyclones have formed, eighteen in the Eastern Pacific and two in the Central Pacific, and all became named storms. Eleven of the storms strengthened into hurricanes, with four of them intensifying into major hurricanes. Activity within the Eastern Pacific began with the formation and development of Tropical Storm Alvin on May 28, two weeks after the official start of the season, but nearly two weeks earlier than the average formation date of the basin's first named storm. Alvin persisted off the coast of Mexico for a few days before degenerating into a remnant low on May 31. The pace of activity quickened in early June. Two storms, Hurricane Barbara and Tropical Storm Cosme, formed on June 8, off the coast of southwestern Mexico. Next came Tropical Storm Dalila, which formed near the coast of southern Mexico on June 13. Hurricane Erick followed early on June 17, off the coast of southern Mexico. Erick was the earliest major hurricane on record to make landfall on either coast of Mexico (Pacific or Atlantic); the previous Pacific coast record was set by Hurricane Kiko on August 26, 1989. Next came Hurricane Flossie on June 29, which became a Category 3 hurricane off the southwestern coast of Mexico Dalila, Erick, and Flossie became the earliest fourth, fifth, and sixth named storms respectively in the Eastern Pacific since official naming of storms began there in 1960.

Tropical activity in the Central Pacific commenced in late July, with the formation of Hurricane Iona on July 27 and Tropical Storm Keli the following day, marking the first time in a decade there were two concurrent named storms that formed in central pacific basin. Both tracked to the south of Island of Hawaiʻi, with Iona crossing the International Date Line. Soon thereafter, Hurricane Gil formed in the open Eastern Pacific on July 31, far south-southwest of the Baja California peninsula. Four tropical cyclones formed during the month of August. The month began with Hurricane Henriette, which formed on August 4 southwest of the Baja California peninsula and eventually moved northeast of Hawaii. It was soon joined by Tropical Storm Ivo on August 6. Systems that developed later in the month were Tropical Storm Juliette on August 24 and Hurricane Kiko on August 31. Each formed well offshore of the southern tip of Baja California. Four systems developed during September: Hurricane Lorena on September 2, Tropical Storm Mario on September 11, Hurricane Narda on September 21, and Hurricane Octave on September 30. In early October, Hurricane Priscilla formed, ultimately paralleling the Southwestern coast of Mexico, causing rain, high surf, and rip currents. Additionally, heavy rainfall was recorded in the Southwestern United States. Tropical Storm Raymond followed, bringing rainfall to Arizona, particularly Pinal County. In late October, Tropical Storm Sonia formed, tracking westward out to sea. This season's ACE index was approximately 127.3 units, as officially calculated by the National Hurricane Center (NHC).

== Systems ==
=== Tropical Storm Alvin ===
- Tropical storm (SSHWS)
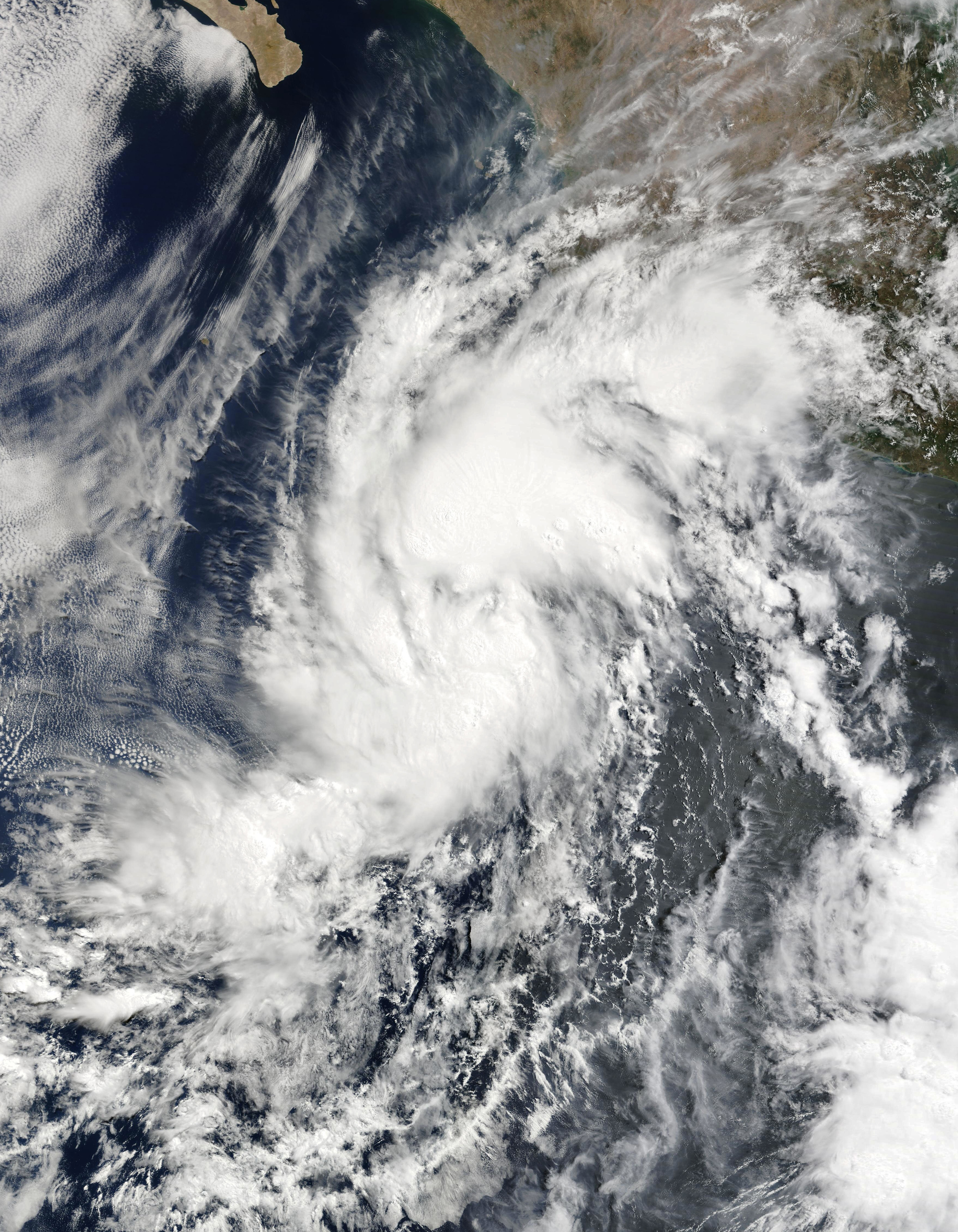
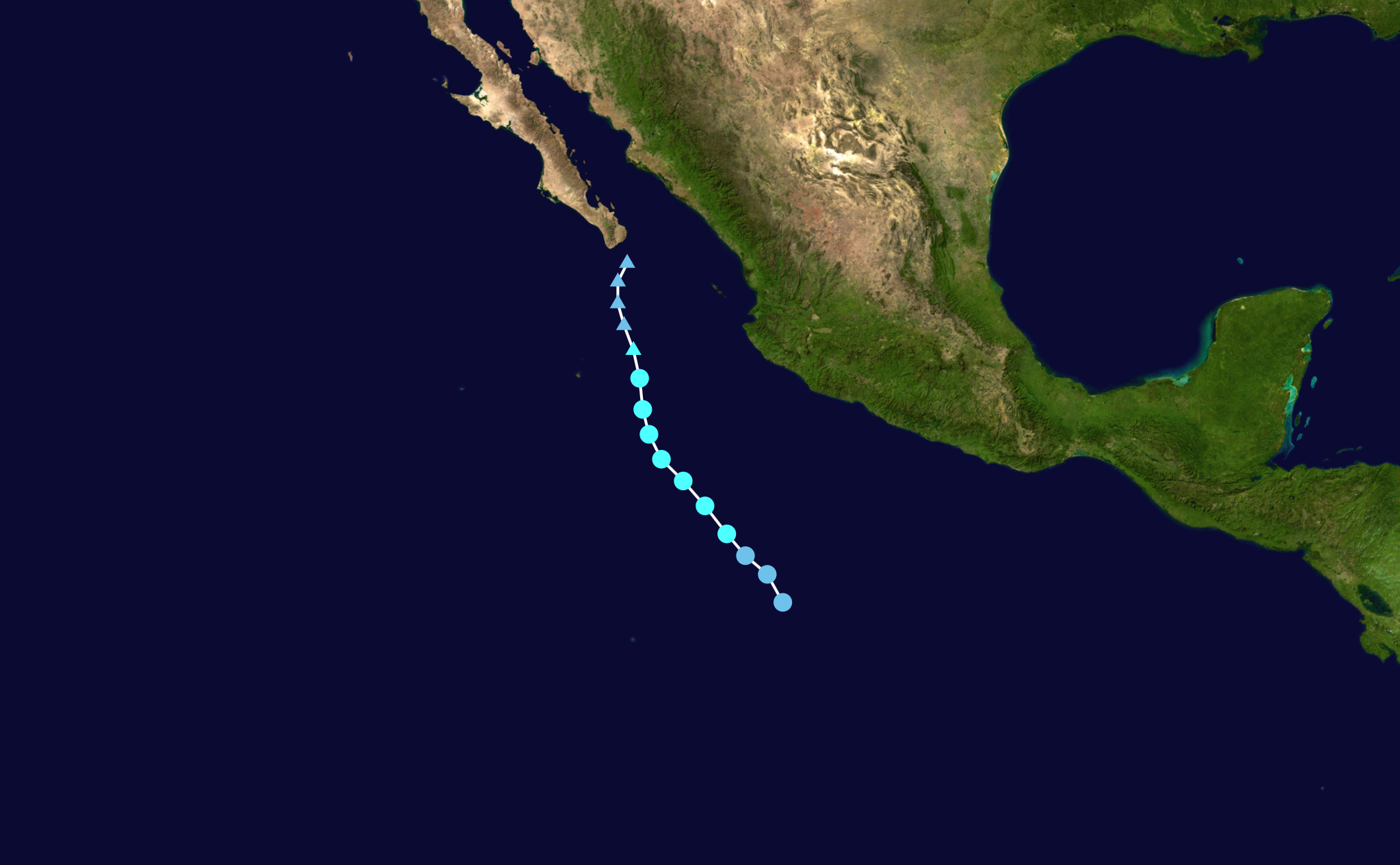
- Duration: May 28 – May 31
- Peak intensity: 60 mph (95 km/h) (1-min); 999 mbar (hPa)

A large area of disturbed weather formed along the eastern North Pacific monsoon trough, developing a low pressure area on May 25 off the coast of southern Mexico. Between May 26 and 27, the disturbance began organize while moving westward, before turning to the northwest. On May 28 at 18:00 UTC, it developed into Tropical Depression One‑E about 470 mi (760 km) southwest of Acapulco, Mexico.F On May 29 at 12:00 UTC, the depression strengthened into Tropical Storm Alvin. With warm waters and low wind shear, Alvin continued to organize, with satellite imagery showing an increase in convective banding and colder cloud tops. At 18:00 UTC, Alvin peaked with maximum sustained winds of 60 mph (100 km/h) and a minimum central pressure of 999 mbar (29.50 inHg). However, increasing southwesterly wind shear and dry air intrusions caused Alvin to quickly weaken. Alvin then turned north towards the Baja California peninsula due to a ridge over central Mexico. By May 30, all convection in the southern half of the storm collapsed. On May 31, at 06:00 UTC, the system degenerated to a remnant low, and dissipated on June 1, at 06:00 UTC.

The disturbance that spawned Alvin caused heavy rainfall that triggered flash flooding in the Mexican state of Chiapas and neighboring El Salvador. In Chiapas, power outages, downed trees, and damaged vehicles were reported. Eleven homes were damaged and one home was destroyed. Damage was reported across at three communities. A man drowned after he was swept away by floodwaters. In La Libertad, El Salvador, storm surge inundated several businesses. Rough surf injured at least 50 people and twelve people were displaced. Heavy rainfall from Alvin caused flooding, fallen trees, stranded vehicles, power outages, and traffic accidents across Western Mexico. In Manzanillo, Colima, one person was rescued from rough surf. The ports of Cabo San Lucas, San José del Cabo, Huatulco were closed to small boat traffic. Three shelters were opened in Oaxaca. Remnant moisture from Alvin also generated heavy rainfall over Mexico City, damaging roads, downing trees, and trapping vehicles. The Mexico City Metro experienced significant delays due to flooded roadways. Damage was reported across at least four boroughs. Remnant moisture from Alvin triggered severe thunderstorms across the Southwestern United States. Flooding, downed trees, and power outages were reported. In California, at least five stranded were vehicles. Sulphur Springs Valley Electric Company reported that fallen tree branches, strong winds, lightning and heavy rainfall, cut power to 1,400 people in Douglas, Arizona. In New Mexico, one person drowned as a result of freshwater flooding. Damages were estimated to be greater than US$100,000.

=== Hurricane Barbara ===
- Category 1 hurricane (SSHWS)
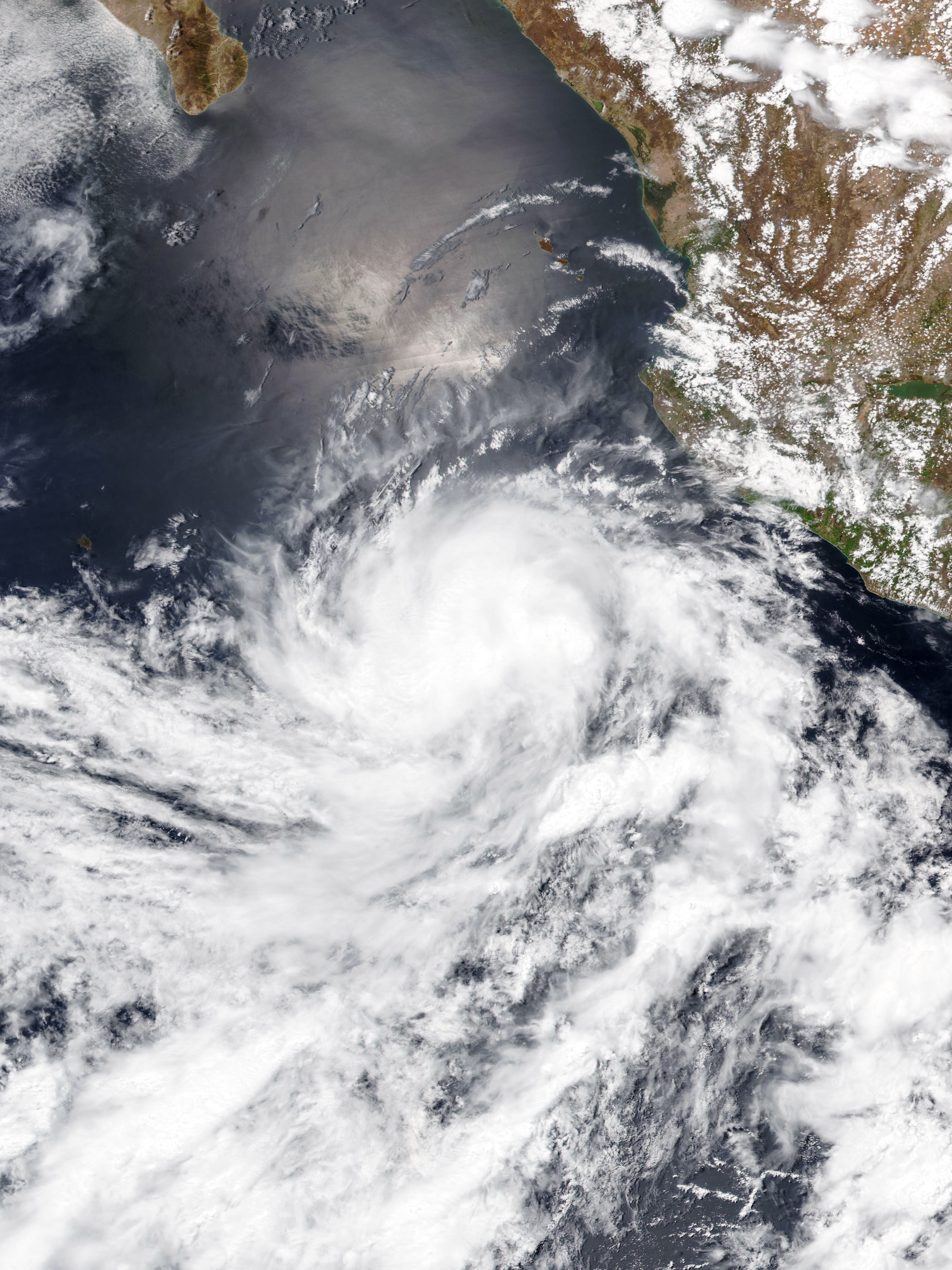
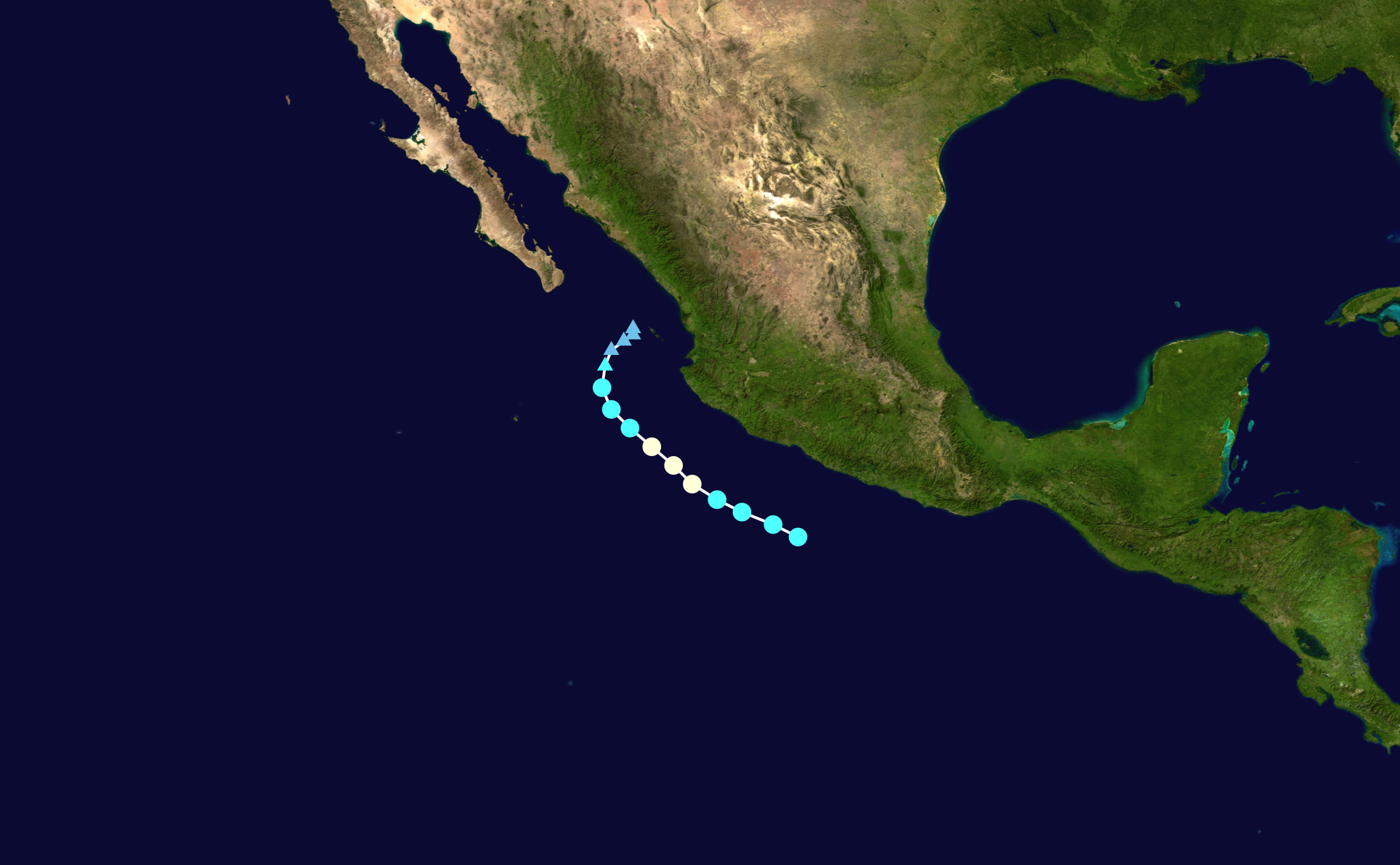
- Duration: June 8 – June 10
- Peak intensity: 75 mph (120 km/h) (1-min); 991 mbar (hPa)

On June 4, a trough of low pressure formed off the coast of southern Mexico. Two days later, showers and thunderstorms associated with the low gradually increased near the Gulf of Tehuantepec. By the morning of June 8, a closed and well-defined low-level circulation had developed within the disturbance, marking the formation of Tropical Storm Barbara. Barbara steadily strengthened into the next day, and by 14:00 UTC on June 9, had become a minimal Category 1 hurricane, with maximum sustained winds of 75 mph (120 km/h) while located about 155 mi (250 km) southwest of Manzanillo, Colima. Later that same day, however, the system weakened, and fell below hurricane strength. Then, on June 10, as Barbara moved through cooler waters and into a less favorable atmospheric environment, its deep convection diminished considerably, and by late that same day, it had degenerated to a remnant low. The remnant low then dissipated two days later.

Periods of heavy rain were reported in Nayarit, Jalisco, Colima, and Michoacán. In Acapulco, minor flooding, fallen trees, power outages, wall collapses, and landslides were reported. Heavy rains damaged a drainpipe, causing wastewater to flood several streets.

=== Tropical Storm Cosme ===
- Tropical storm (SSHWS)
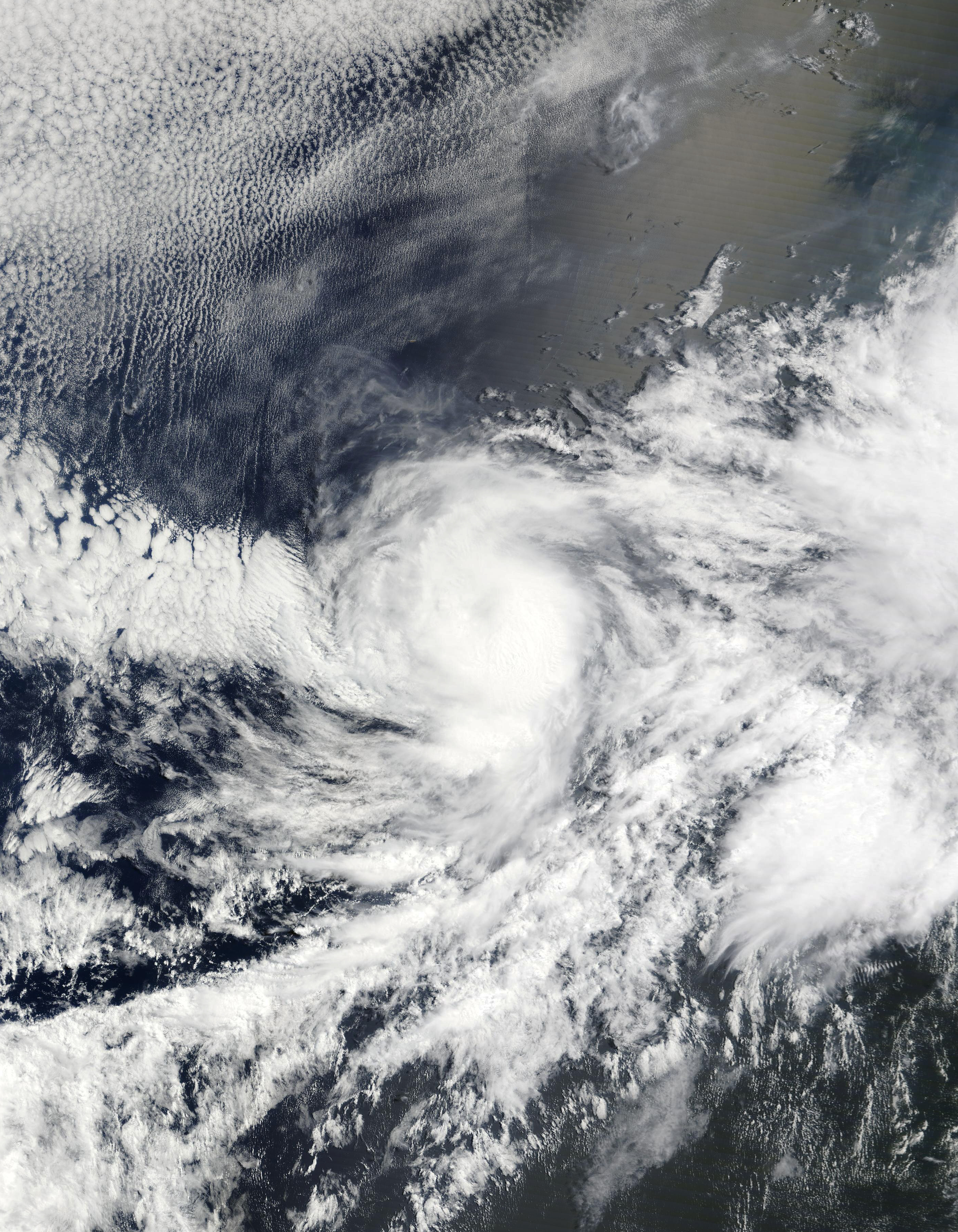
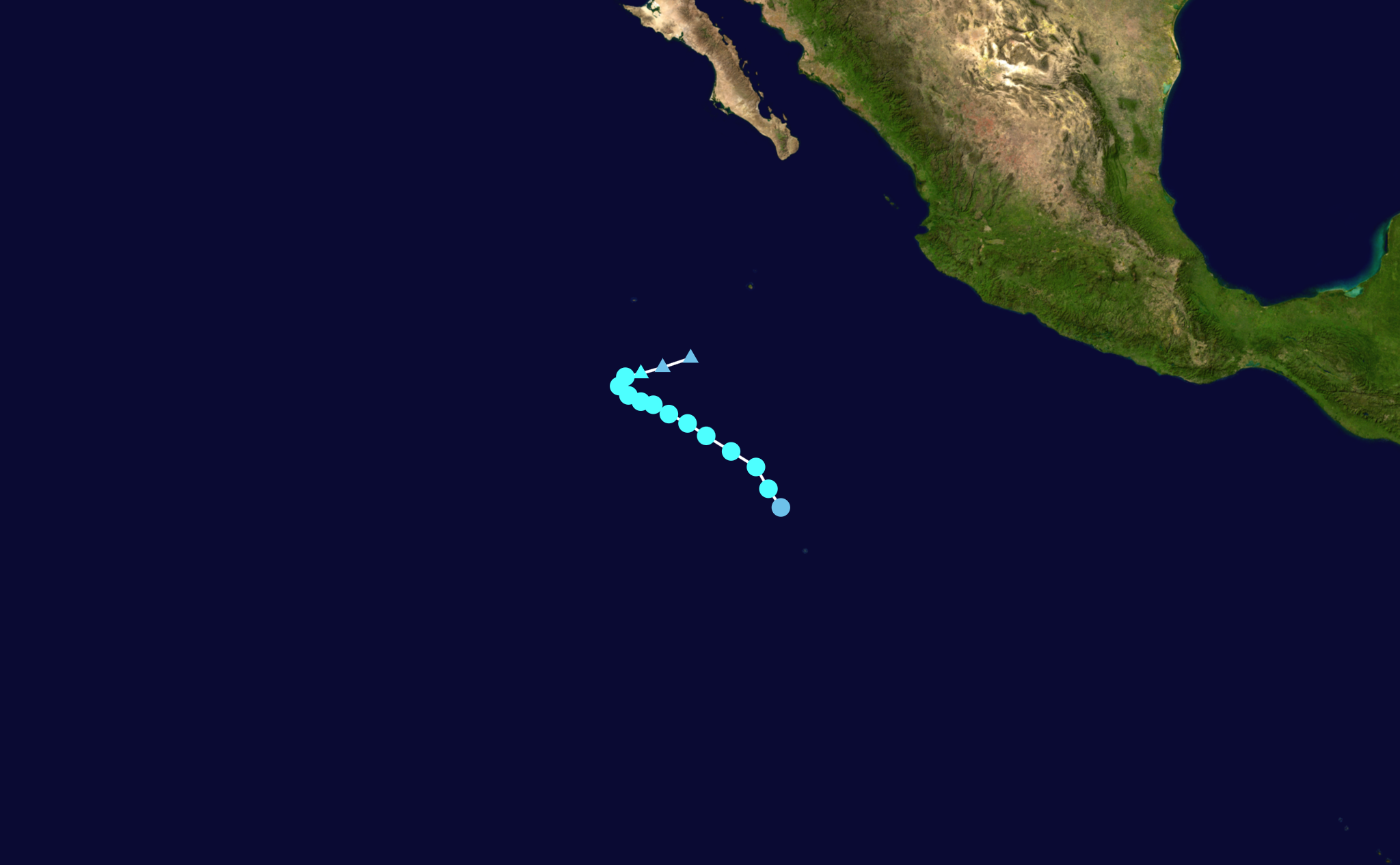
- Duration: June 8 – June 11
- Peak intensity: 70 mph (110 km/h) (1-min); 991 mbar (hPa)

On June 6, a broad area of low pressure formed along the western side of an elongated trough south of Mexico. Showers and thunderstorms associated with the low became considerably better organized early on June 8, resulting in the formation of Tropical Depression Three-E. Moving slowly northwestward, the system soon strengthened into Tropical Storm Cosme. Cosme continued to intensify, and by the afternoon of June 9, was nearing hurricane strength, with sustained winds of 70 mph (110 km/h). Additional strengthening was stifled, however, and Cosme began weakening the following morning, due to the effects of moderate northeasterly wind shear and the presence of Barbara to the northeast. Ultimately, all deep convection ceased, and the storm degenerated to a remnant low early on June 11. The remnant low then dissipated early the next day.

=== Tropical Storm Dalila ===
- Tropical storm (SSHWS)
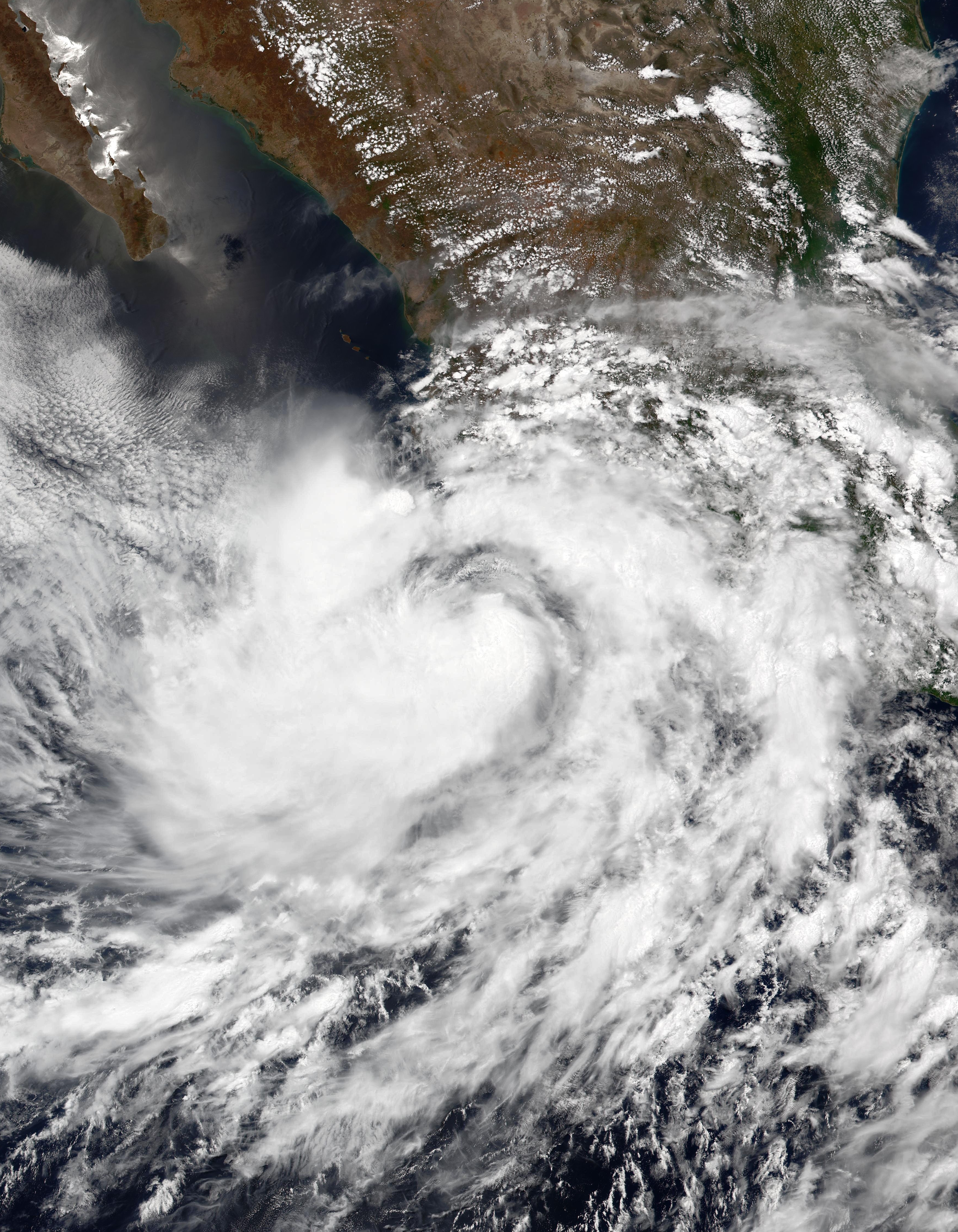
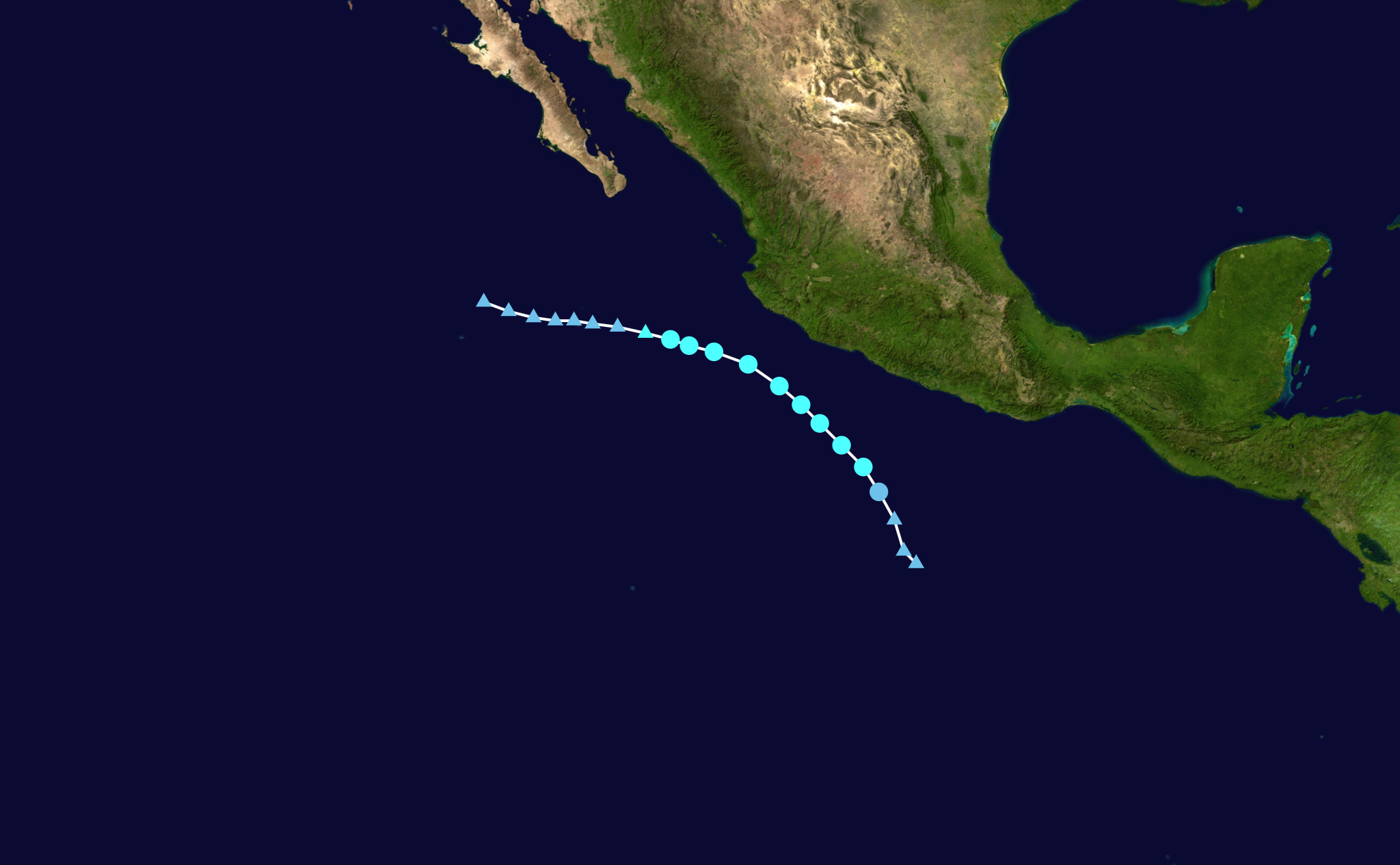
- Duration: June 13 – June 15
- Peak intensity: 65 mph (100 km/h) (1-min); 992 mbar (hPa)

On June 10, a broad area of low pressure located several hundred miles south of the Gulf of Tehuantepec began to show signs of organization. Showers and thunderstorms associated with the low increased the following day, though its low-level circulation remained broad and elongated. Due to the increasing likelihood of the system developing into a tropical storm, and its proximity to coastal Mexico, the NHC designated it Potential Tropical Cyclone Four‑E at 21:00 UTC on June 12. The system gradually became better organized, developing into Tropical Depression Four‑E, then soon strengthening into Tropical Storm Dalila at 18:00 UTC on June 13, about 195 mi (315 km) south of Zihuatanejo, Guerrero. The storm continued to gain strength the following day near the coast of southwestern Mexico, its sustained winds reaching 65 mph (100 km/h) that afternoon. However, on the morning of June 15, Dalila began weakening, and it became a remnant low late that day. The remnant low dissipated two days later.

The storm produced heavy rainfall in southwest Mexico, peaking at 7.48 in (190 mm) near Acapulco, which led to floods and landslides. In Chiapas, a man drowned after being sucked into a sewer while helping unclog it. Also in the state, a pickup track was swept into a ravine, and a vehicle was stranded. A bridge collapsed over the Omitlán River, and landslides blocked traffic in Chilpancingo. In Oaxaca, a portion of Mexican Federal Highway 200 was damaged, and several homes sustained roof damage. In Guerrero, the storm destroyed 40 buildings and flooded more than 300 homes. Commercial losses in Acapulco were estimated at Mex$750 million (US$39.4 million). In Colima, waves heights reached 6 m (19.7 ft), causing five boats to sink. The storm also collapsed 13 beach huts. In Michoacán, storm surge caused garbage to pile up on beaches. In Querétaro, the El Carmen Reservoir overflowed and flooded eight neighborhoods. The floods damaged 71 homes and swept away four vehicles. Sinkholes and floods forced families to evacuate.

=== Hurricane Erick ===
- Category 4 hurricane (SSHWS)
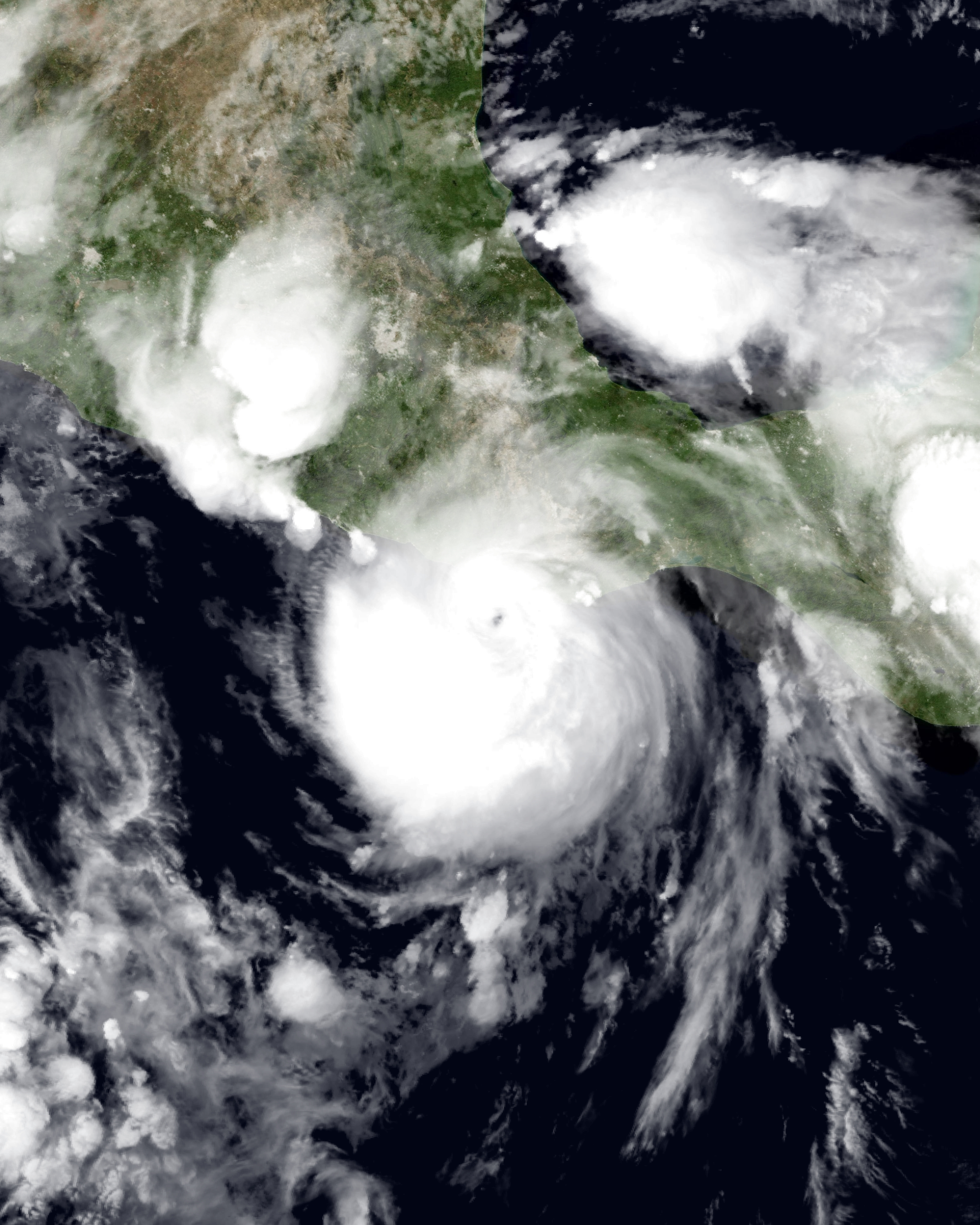
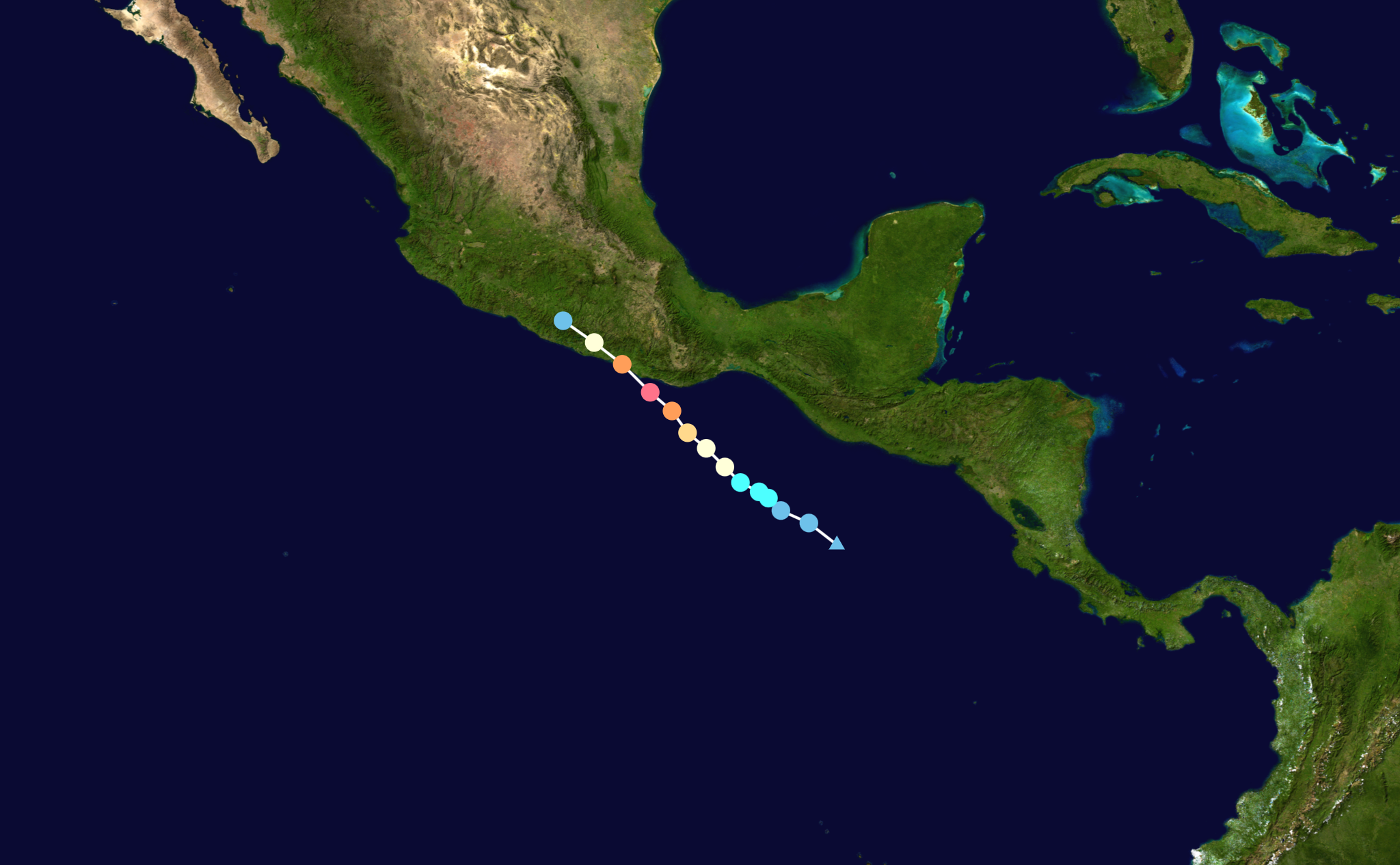
- Duration: June 17 – June 20
- Peak intensity: 140 mph (220 km/h) (1-min); 944 mbar (hPa)

On June 14, a slow-moving tropical wave emerged off the coast of Central America. After entering the basin, a broad area of low pressure began to develop west of Costa Rica. Showers and thunderstorms associated with the low became better organized over the next couple of days, as the disturbance moved westward over very warm waters, and within a moist, low wind shear environment. The NHC designated it Potential Tropical Cyclone Five‑E at 21:00 UTC on June 16, The system soon acquired a well-defined circulation, developing into Tropical Depression Five‑E by 00:00 UTC on June 17. The depression then strengthened into Tropical Storm Erick 12 hours later, while moving west-northwestward along the southwestern periphery of a mid-level ridge situated over Mexico. Later, deep convection expanded, and cloud tops cooled to about −120 °F (−85 °C) near the improving inner-core structure. Erick began a period of rapid intensification late that day, becoming a hurricane by 06:00 UTC on June 18, about 215 mi (345 km) south of Salina Cruz, Oaxaca, then reaching category 3 strength about 12 hours later, while located about 100 mi (155 km) south of Puerto Ángel, Oaxaca. Late that same day, Erick developed a concentric eyewall structure, indicative of an eyewall replacement cycle. After the cycle was complete, the system intensified further, reaching its peak intensity, with Category 4 sustained winds of 140 mph (220 km/h) and a minimum central pressure of 944 mb (27.88 inHg). Erick made landfall near 11:30 UTC on June 19, in the municipality of Santo Domingo Armenta, in extreme western Oaxaca, with sustained winds of 125 mph (205 km/h). Inland, the hurricane rapidly weakened as its inner core began to collapse. Moving northwestward over rugged terrain, Erick's inner core quickly deteriorated, and the system's overall convective pattern became quite ragged. Erick weakened into a tropical depression by 00:00 UTC on June 20, and its circulation dissipated soon afterward.

Severe damage was reported in Oaxaca and Guerrero. Strong winds blew off the roofs of homes and flooding severely affected crops. Landslides destroyed roads, tunnels, and bridges, isolating several communities. A maximum of 14.13 inches (359 mm) of rainfall was recorded in Presidente Benito Juarez, Oaxaca. A peak storm surge of 1.05 ft (32 cm) was reported in Puerto Ángel. Losses totaled to at least US$350 million according to Gallagher Re. In Guatemala, rainfall from Erick caused flooding, resulting in 27 injuries, one missing, and more than 1,000 displaced. In Honduras, flooding and landslides forced the evacuation of more than 70 families. At least 24 people were killed: eighteen in Guatemala, two in Honduras, and four in Mexico.

=== Hurricane Flossie ===
- Category 3 hurricane (SSHWS)
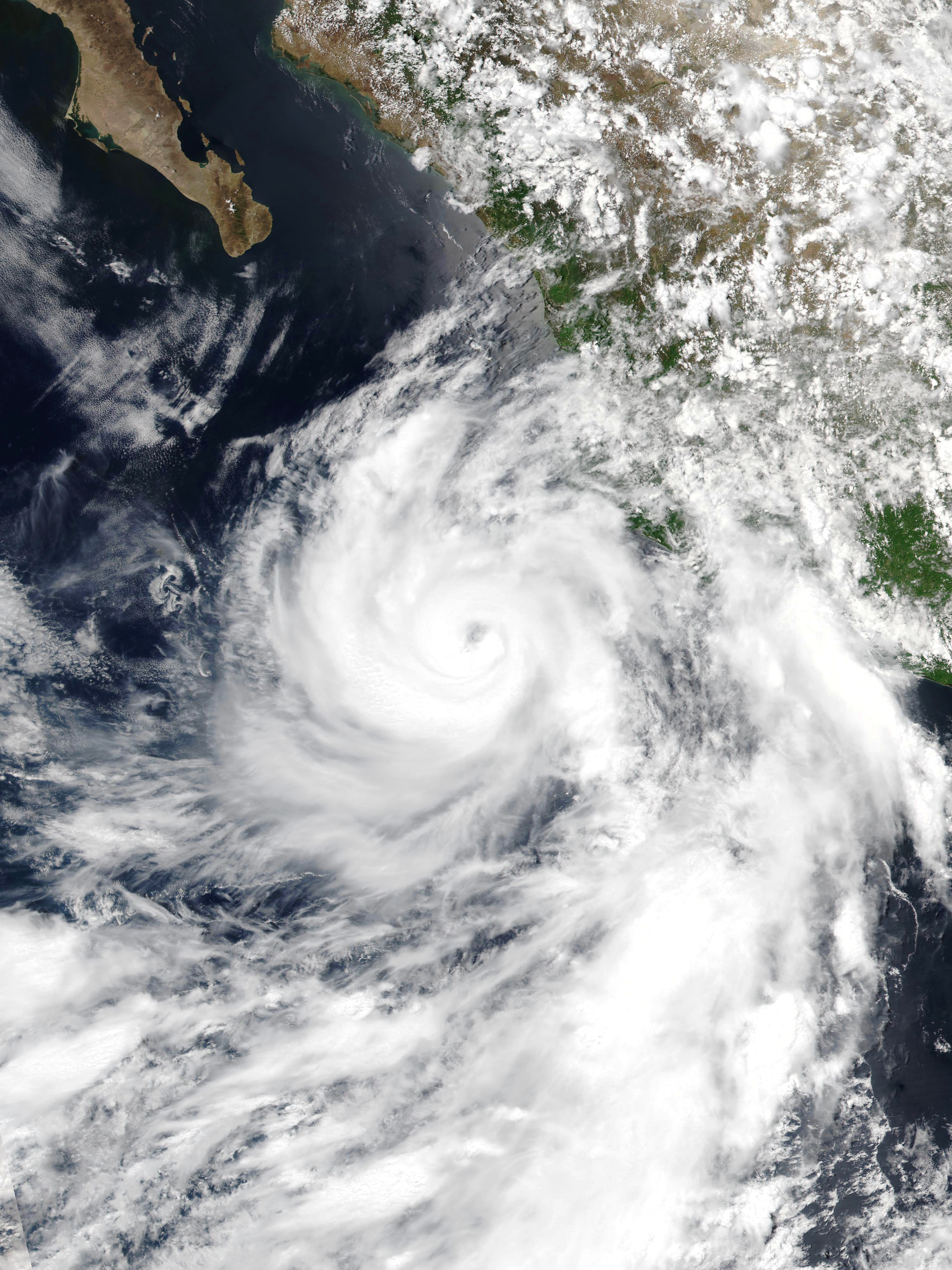
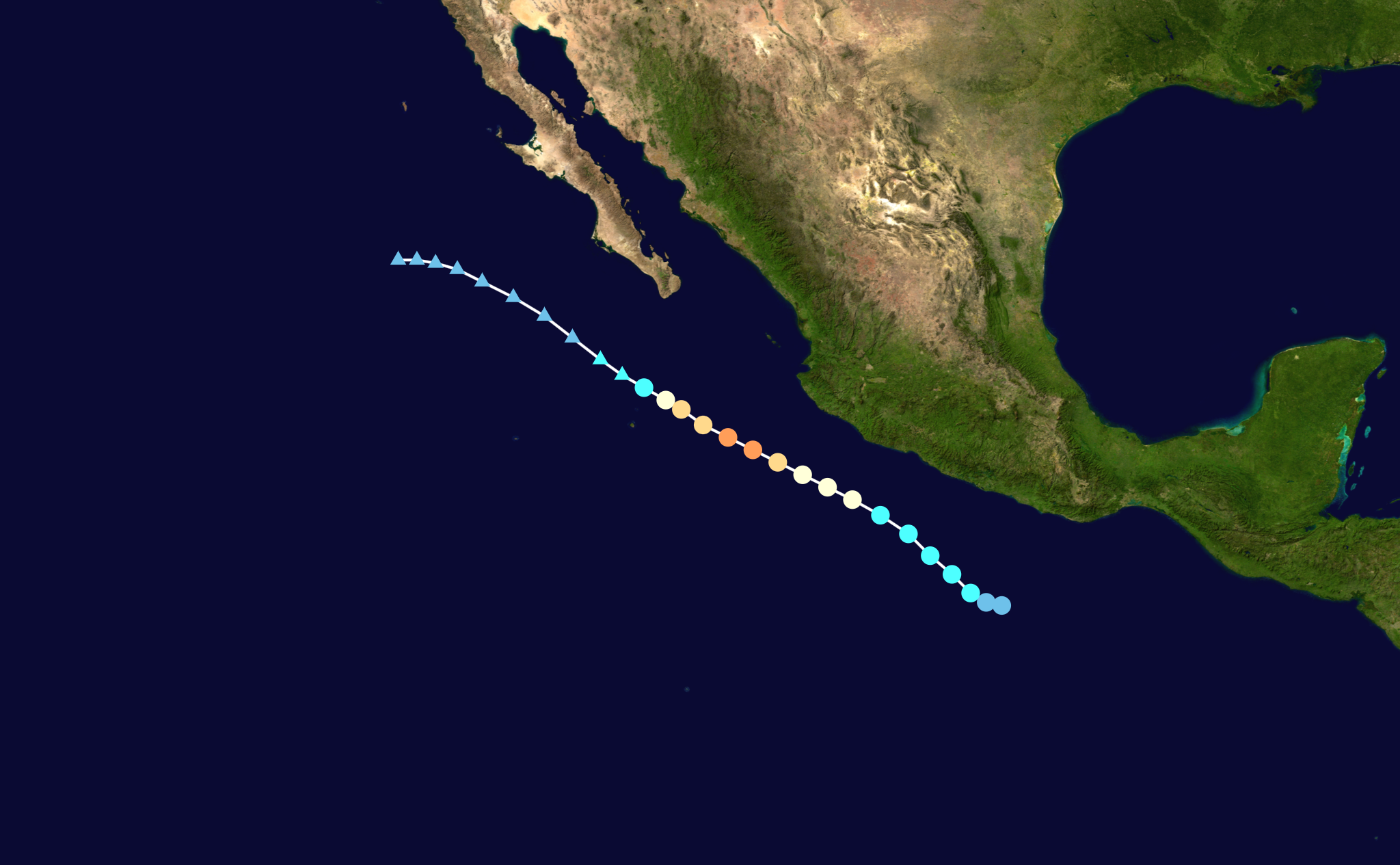
- Duration: June 29 – July 3
- Peak intensity: 120 mph (195 km/h) (1-min); 958 mbar (hPa)

On June 23, a broad area of low pressure formed off the Pacific coast of Central America. After several days within favorable environment, the shower and thunderstorm activity associated with the disturbance become much better organized on June 28, and Tropical Depression Six-E formed early the next morning, when the low developed a well-defined, closed low-level circulation with maximum winds around 30 mph (45 km/h). Convection continued to become better organized, with curved banding to the north of the center a few hours later, marking the formation of Tropical Storm Flossie that same day. Flossie steadily gained strength on June 30, amid a favorable environment of low wind shear and warm sea surface temperatures of about 84 to 86 °F (29 to 30 °C), the storm attained hurricane strength late that day, about 175 mi (280 km) south of Manzanillo, Colima. The system continued to rapidly intensify on July 1, becoming a Category 3 major hurricane by day's end and reached peak winds of 120 mph (195 km/h). The next morning, Flossie's eye became more ragged and the northern eyewall started to deteriorate, weakening the system to Category 2 strength. Flossie's structure continued to degrade, and, early on July 3, it weakened to a tropical storm. Then, having moved over colder sea surface temperatures southwest of Baja California Sur, the storm lost all convection, and transitioned into a post-tropical low that afternoon and dissipated three days later.

The outer rain bands of Flossie produced 1 to 3 inches of rain across the Pacific coast of Mexico. Flooding, fallen trees, land slides, and minor property damage was reported in Michoacán. More than 20 homes were flooded in the state. An elderly woman was rescued from her flooded home. Traffic accidents were reported across Michoacán and Nayarit. There were a total of 36 reports of damage to palapas along beaches. In Bahía de Banderas, dozens of homes were flooded and a wall of an elementary school collapsed. A waterspout damaged several structures. Similar damage was reported in the neighboring states of Guerrero, and Colima. In Acapulco, vehicles were swept away by overflowing rivers. A landslide knocked down two utility poles. In Manzanillo, Colima, winds gusted up to 45 mph (75 km/h). A man drowned after being swept away by rough surf. In Baja California Sur, 75 mm (3.0 in) of rain fell. In Querétaro, landslides blocked roads, isolating several communities. Over 100 mm (3.9 in) of rain fell in some areas, causing three walls to collapse. At least nine neighborhoods were flooded. An interaction of Flossie and another low pressure system brought heavy rains to Sinaloa. At least ten homes were flooded and a sinkhole was reported. Two vehicles were stranded and three cars were damaged. A market was flooded.

=== Hurricane Iona ===
- Category 4 hurricane (SSHWS)
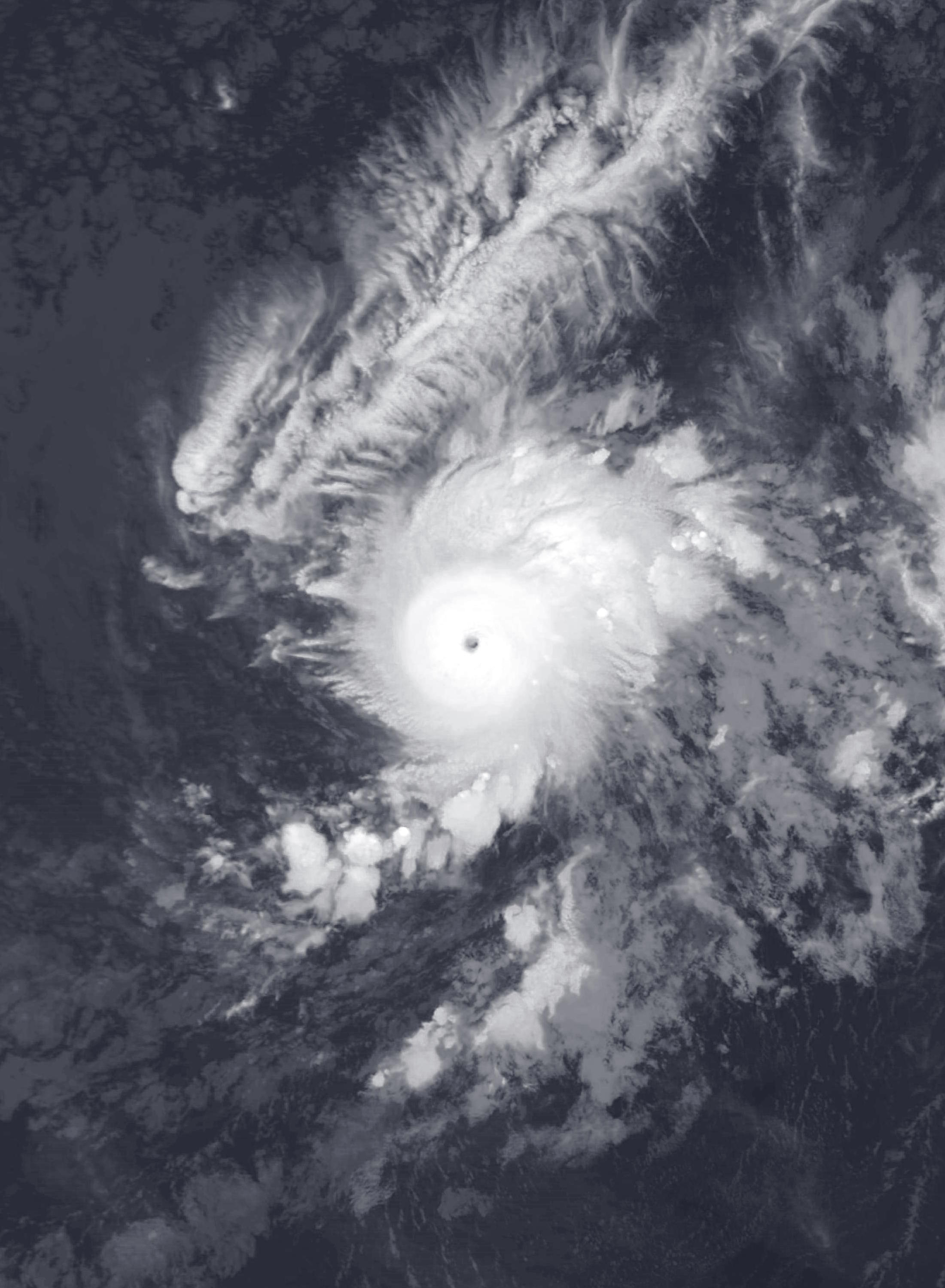
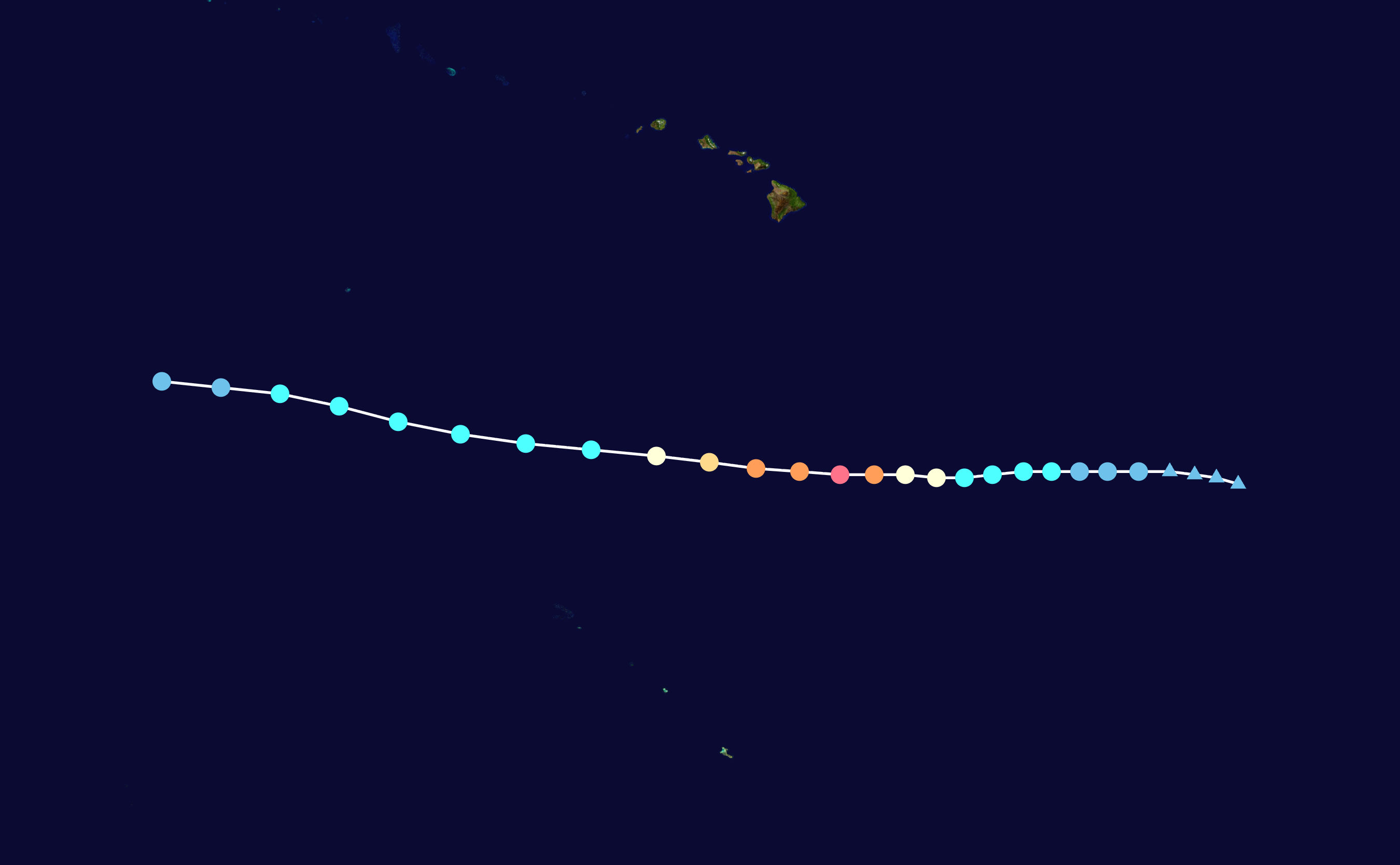
- Duration: July 27 – August 1
- Peak intensity: 130 mph (215 km/h) (1-min); 956 mbar (hPa)

On July 24, a broad area of low pressure developed in the Eastern Pacific, far to the southeast of the Hawaiian Islands. The disturbance moved into the Central Pacific the following day. The low became better organized as it moved westward, and developed persistent deep convection on July 26. Consequently, the disturbance was designated Tropical Depression One-C early on July 27. Later that day, the system strengthened into Tropical Storm Iona. The storm quickly intensified amid favorable environmental conditions overnight, attaining hurricane strength early on July 28. By late that day, Iona had developed a well-defined eye, surrounded by −94 to −112 °F (−70 to −80 °C) cloud tops, as it rapidly intensified to a Category 3 major hurricane by 09:00 UTC on July 29. Having already strengthened by about 60 mph (95 km/h) in 24 hours, the system continued to rapidly intensify, with its sustained winds reaching 130 mph (215 km/h) several hours later as a Category 4. Though a powerful system, Iona's windfield remained compact, with hurricane- and tropical-storm-force winds only extending to around 25 mi (35 km) and 80 mi (130 km) from the center, respectively. Later that day, Iona began to weaken, due to increasing westerly wind shear and cooler sea surface temperatures, as it passed about 715 mi (1,150 km) south of Honolulu. This trend continued, and by midday on July 30, the system had rapidly weakened to a tropical storm. For the next couple of days, the storm moved generally west-northwestward while slowly weakening. Iona was downgraded to a tropical depression shortly before crossing the International Date Line on August 2.

=== Tropical Storm Keli ===
- Tropical storm (SSHWS)
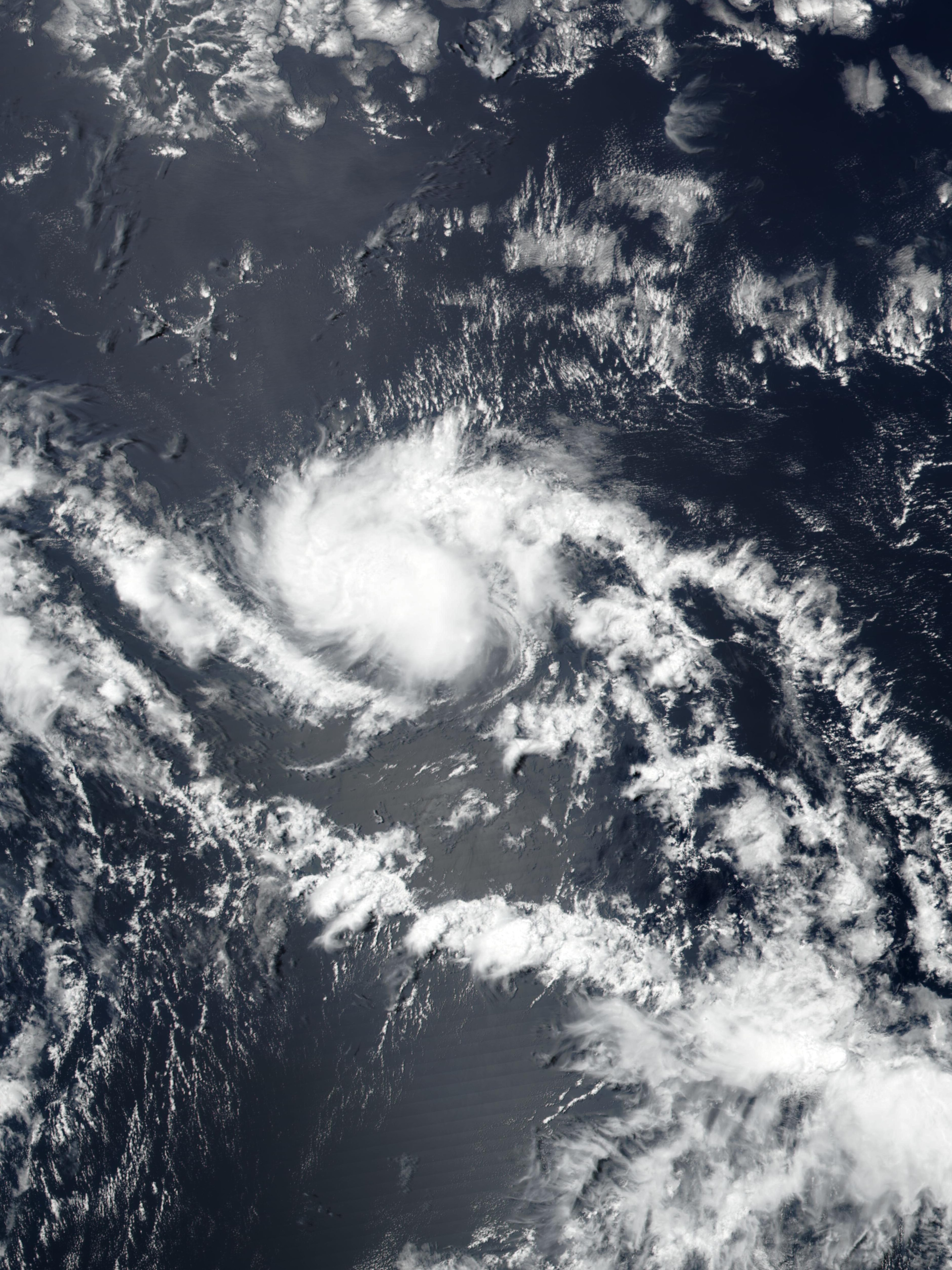
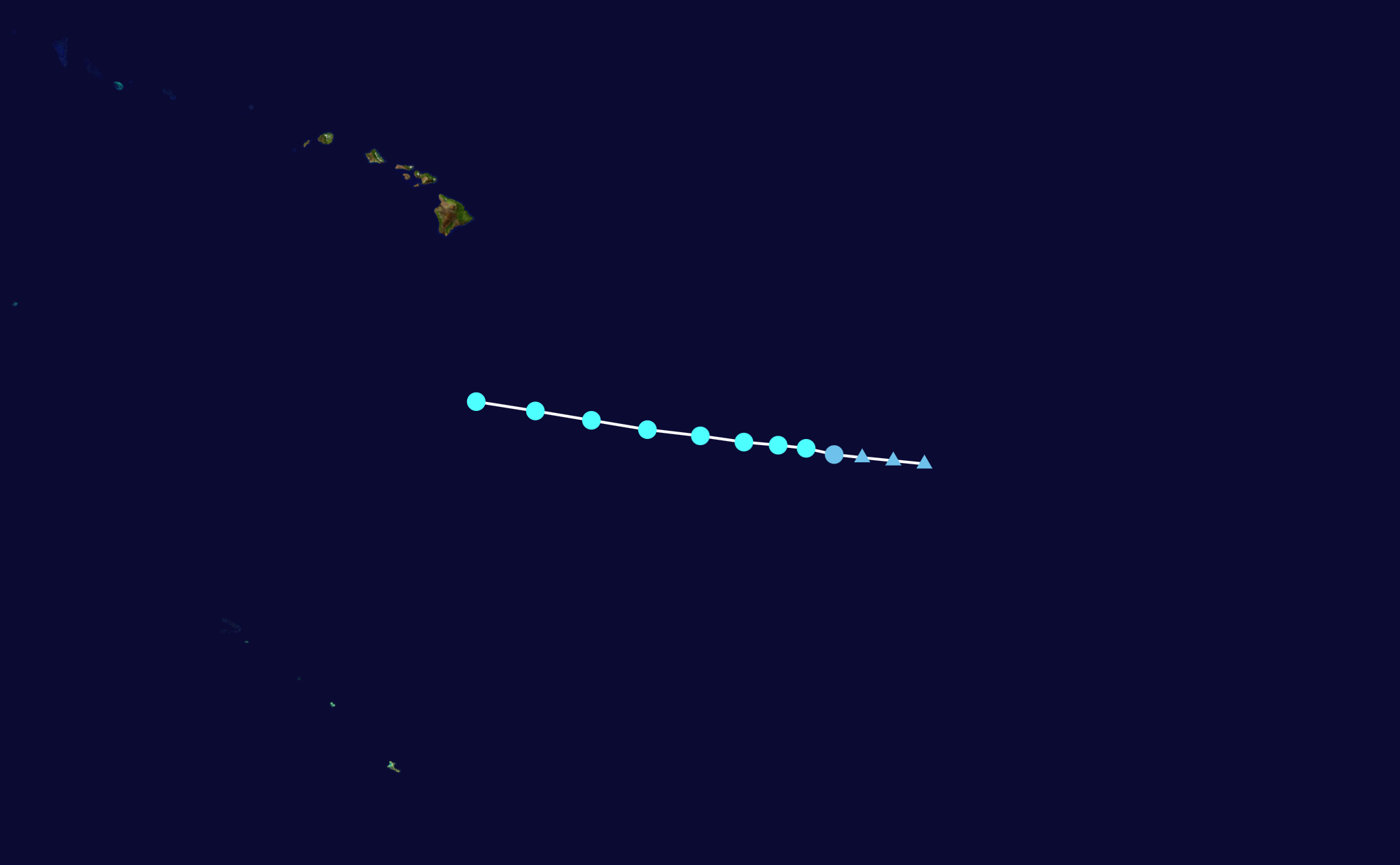
- Duration: July 28 – July 30
- Peak intensity: 50 mph (85 km/h) (1-min); 1003 mbar (hPa)

On July 27, an area of low pressure developed well east-southeast of the Hawaiian Islands. Quickly organizing into a tropical cyclone, the low became Tropical Depression Two-C early on July 28, about 460 mi (740 km) east-northeast of Hurricane Iona. A compact system, the depression's cloud pattern extended only about 105 mi (165 km) across. Later that day, the depression strengthened into Tropical Storm Keli. Keli continued to strengthen, increasing its winds to 50 mph (85 km/h). However, the system struggled to become better organized due to vertical wind shear and upper-level outflow from nearby Hurricane Iona as it tracked westward, steered by a mid-level ridge to its north. Keli remained a minimal tropical storm through the morning of July 30, when its convection mostly collapsed and its low-level circulation opened into a trough on the northern side of Iona, about 520 mi (835 km) south of Honolulu.

=== Hurricane Gil ===
- Category 1 hurricane (SSHWS)
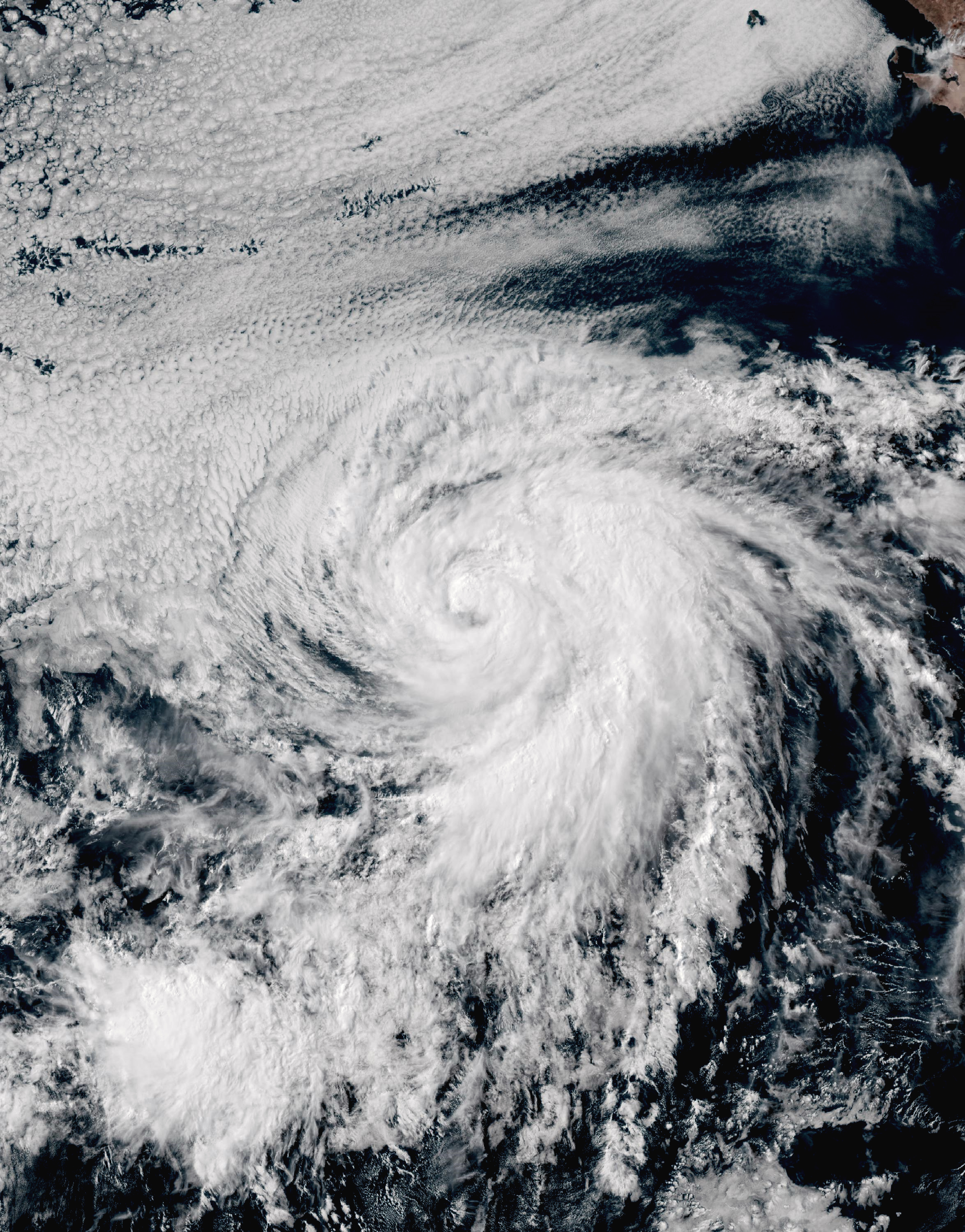
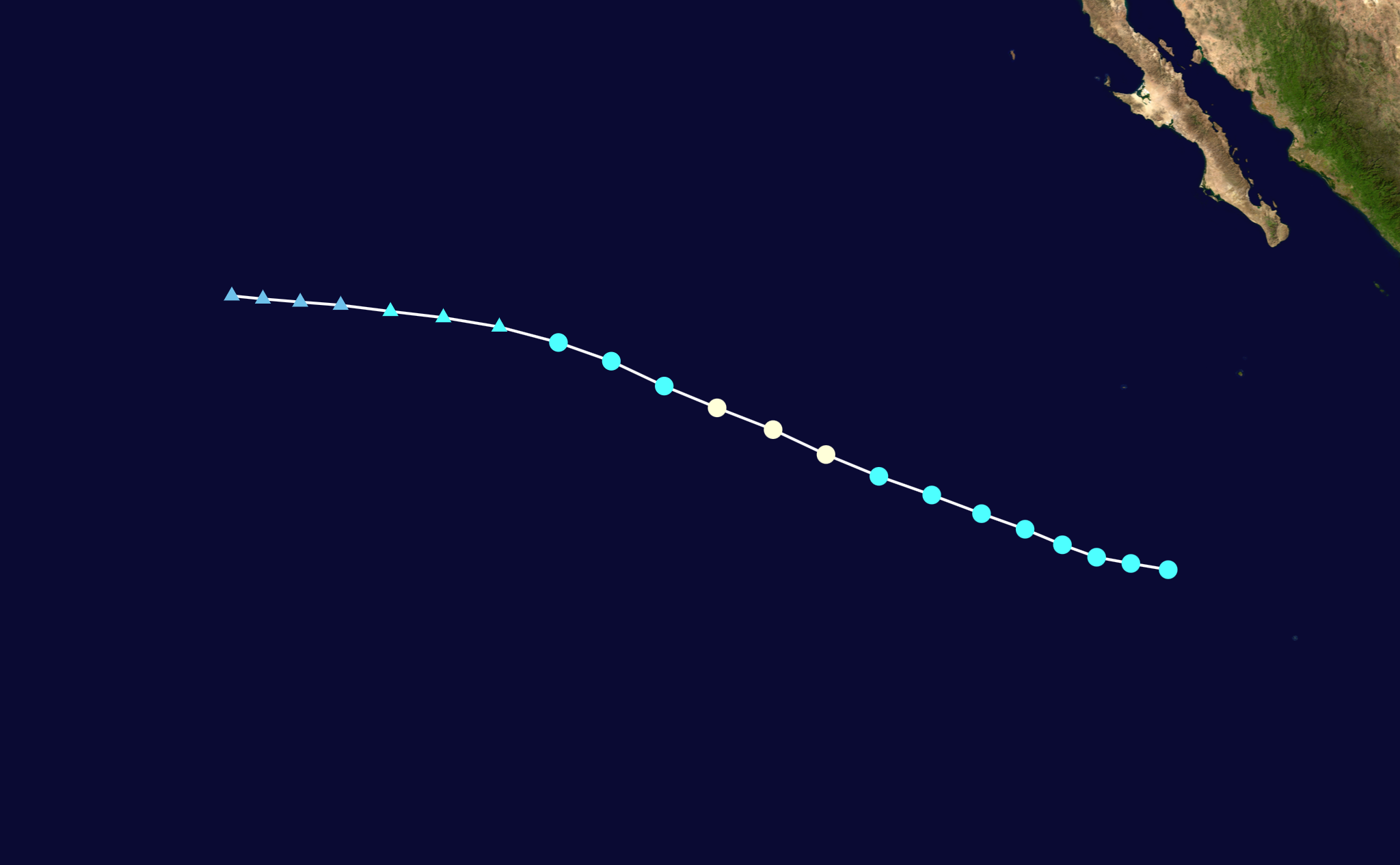
- Duration: July 31 – August 3
- Peak intensity: 75 mph (120 km/h) (1-min); 991 mbar (hPa)

On July 28, a broad area of low pressure formed well off the coast of southwestern Mexico. The disturbance become better organized the following day, and developed into Tropical Storm Gil early on July 31. Afterward, Gil gained strength steadily, while moving quickly toward the west-northwest. Then, late on August 1, after overcoming an intrusion of dry air, the storm strengthened into a 75 mph (120 km/h) hurricane, about 1,080 mi (1,740 km) west-southwest of the southern tip of the Baja California peninsula. However, the system soon moved into cooler waters, causing it to weaken to a tropical storm by the following morning. Later, after becoming devoid of deep convection due to the cool waters and a drier, more stable environment, Gil transitioned into a post-tropical cyclone early on August 3 and dissipated two days later.

Remnant moisture from the storm brought 0.25-0.5 in of rain to parts of Hawaii, helping alleviate drought conditions.

=== Hurricane Henriette ===
- Category 1 hurricane (SSHWS)
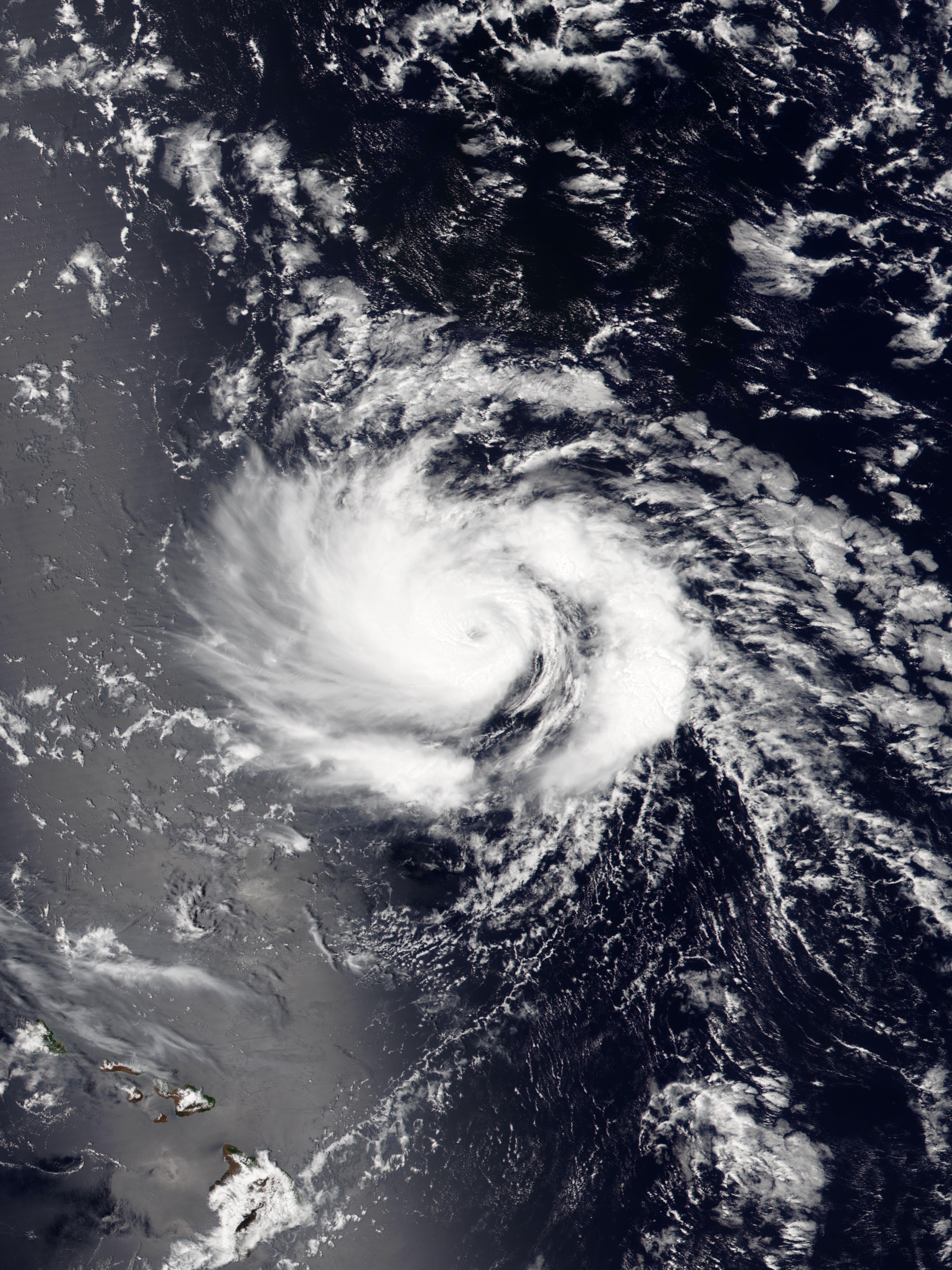
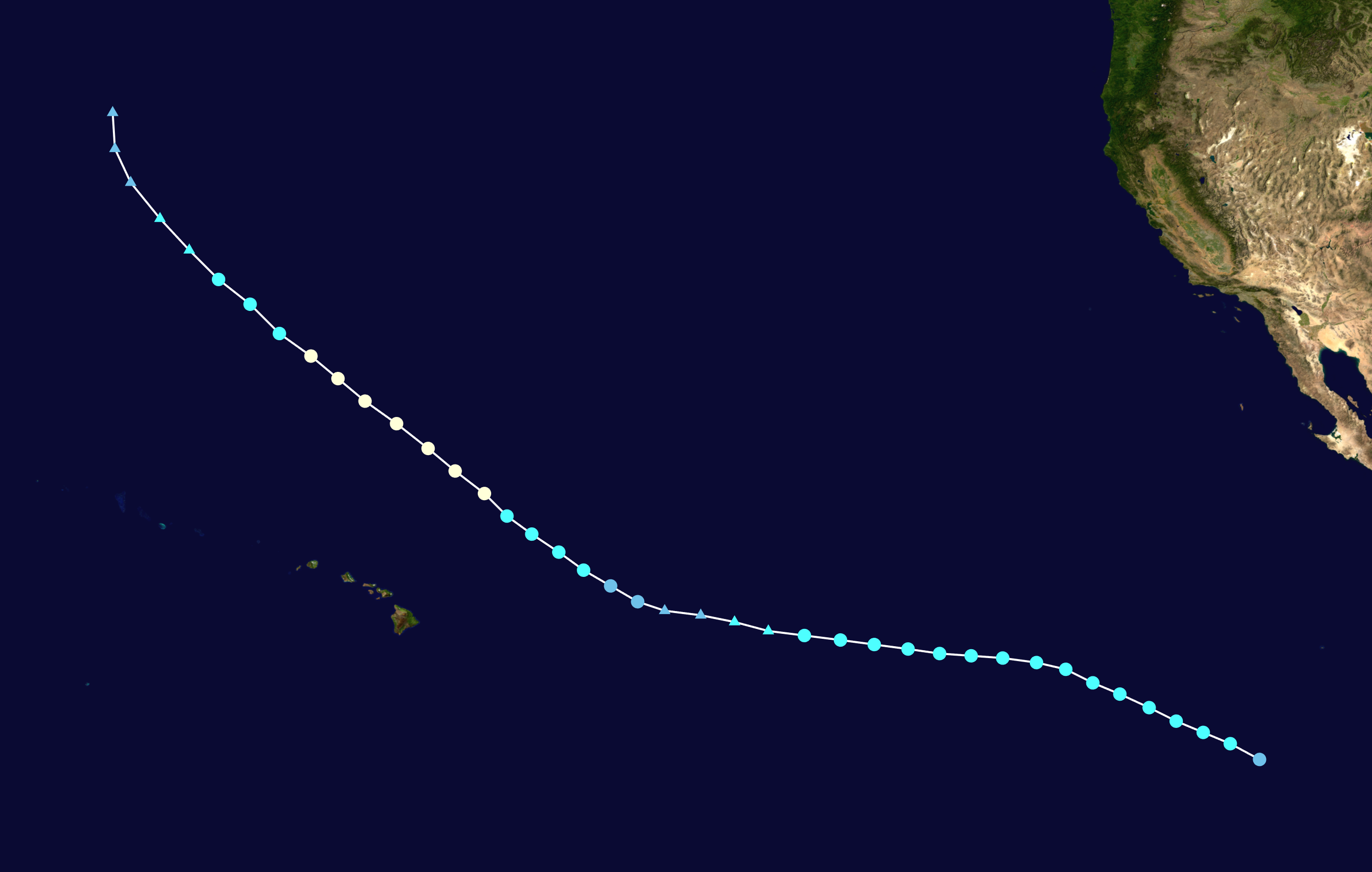
- Duration: August 4 – August 13
- Peak intensity: 85 mph (140 km/h) (1-min); 986 mbar (hPa)

On August 2, a broad area of low pressure formed well off the coast of southwestern Mexico. The disturbance became better organized late the next day, and developed into Tropical Depression Eight‑E. Then, on August 4, it strengthened more, and the depression was upgraded to Tropical Storm Henriette. The system become slightly better organized later in the day as it tracked to the west-northwest, its sustained winds increased to 50 mph (85 km/h). Henriette's strength changed little over the next couple of days, and it remained weak and ragged. Moving westward over gradually cooling waters on August 6, the storm became nearly devoid of all deep convection and the low-level center became fully exposed. At 09:00 UTC on August 8, Henriette crossed into the Central Pacific basin, about 975 mi (1,570 km) east of Hilo, Hawaii. Later that day, Henriette briefly degenerated into a remnant low, before regenerating into a tropical depression the following morning.

Henriette then restrengthened back into a tropical storm the same day. The storm strengthened on August 10, despite the marginal water temperatures, rapidly intensifying into a hurricane at 18:00 UTC that afternoon. Henriette then went through an eyewall replacement early on August 11. GMI imagery that morning showed a ring of deep convection surrounding what remained of the previous eyewall. Later that day, as the system passed about 585 mi (945 km) north of Honolulu, Hawaii, the storm reached its peak with maximum sustained winds of 85 mph (140 km/h), making Henriette one of few storms to reach its peak north of Hawaii. On August 12, Henriette weakened to tropical storm strength as a result of cooler waters and moderate wind shear. Later, as the storm moved northwestward amid increasingly hostile conditions, Henriette's low-level circulation became decoupled from the increasingly fragmented and shallow convection, and it transitioned into a post-tropical cyclone early on August 13 and dissipated the next day.

=== Tropical Storm Ivo ===
- Tropical storm (SSHWS)
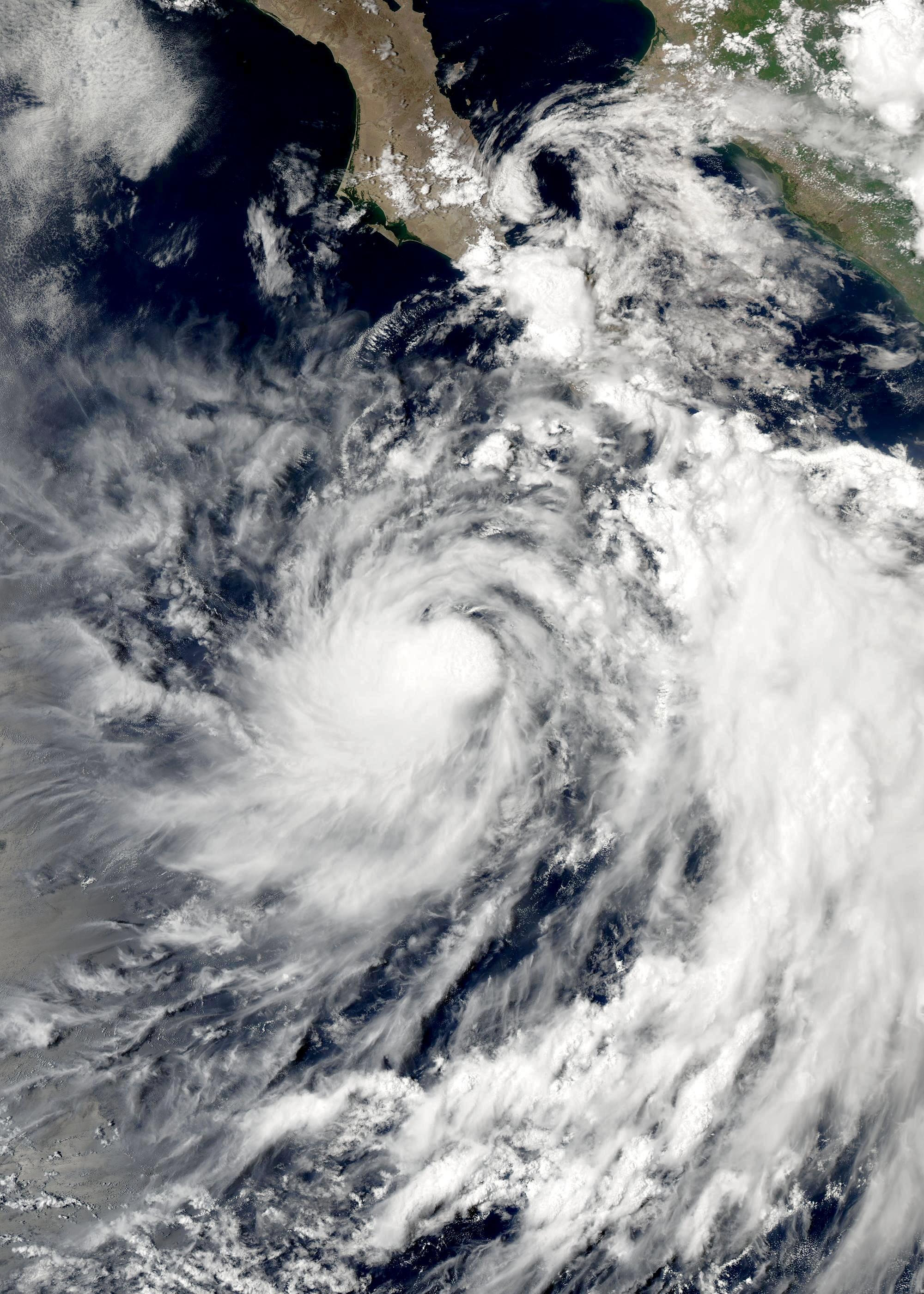
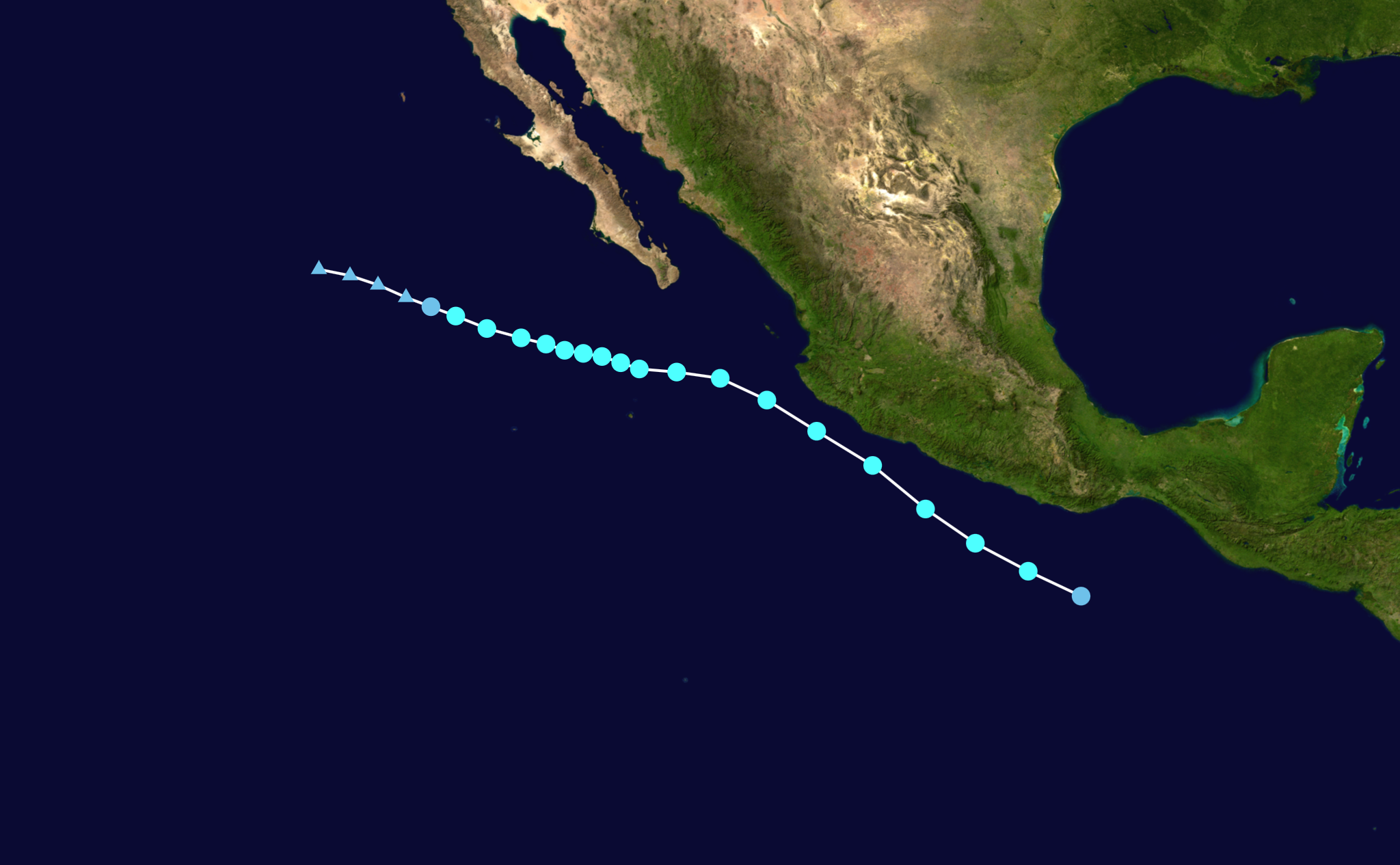
- Duration: August 6 – August 11
- Peak intensity: 65 mph (100 km/h) (1-min); 998 mbar (hPa)

On August 4, an area of low pressure producing disorganized showers and thunderstorms formed just offshore of Central America. The disturbance become better organized during the following day, and developed into Tropical Storm Ivo on the afternoon of August 6, about 195 mi (310 km) south-southeast of Acapulco, Guerrero. Over the next couple of days, Ivo steadily strengthened while moving parallel to the coast of southwestern Mexico. The storm's tropical-storm-force winds, which extended only about 45 mi (75 km) out from the center, remained offshore. Ivo turned westward on August 8, due to strong mid-level ridging entrenched to its north, and its maximum sustained winds increased to 65 mph (100 km/h). The following day, moderate northeasterly shear and gradually cooling sea surface temperatures caused Ivo to weaken. This trend continued, and on August 10, the storm weakened to a tropical depression. By the end of the day, all convection associated with Ivo had dissipated, and the system degenerated into a remnant low early on August 11 and dissipated the next day.

In Oaxaca, flooding and landslides forced road closures. In Acapulco, street flooding was reported and the port was closed to small boat traffic. In Colima, Baja California Sur, Jalisco, and Nayarit, strong wind gusts, periods of heavy rain, and rough surf was reported. In La Paz, Baja California Sur, a minor was rescued after being swept away by an overflowing river. Sinkholes were reported along roadways. Several blackouts were reported. However, rainfall throughout the state was considered beneficial, alleviating drought conditions. In Atoyac, landslides blocked roadways, isolating several communities. In Durango, heavy rains caused a tree to fall, injuring two people. A sewage canal overflowed, flooding several cars outside a clinic. Several motorists were rescued from floodwaters. Two homes were flooded. Interaction of multiple weather systems, including inflow derived from Ivo, brought heavy rains to Sinaloa, where a record 118.7 mm (4.67 in) of rain fell in Mazatlán in 24 hours. Damage was reported across 15 municipalities. A total of 127 people were rescued from floodwaters. Ten sewage canals overflowed, 24 neighborhoods were flooded, and seven roads were closed. Two children were rescued after being swept away by an overflowing river. A pedestrian bridge also collapsed. Eight people were rescued from stranded vehicles. At least seven intersections were closed due to flooding. The government allocated a total of Mex$1.074 million (US$58,000) to support 179 families with recovery efforts from the storm. In Veracruz, an Atlantic basin tropical wave absorbed moisture aloft from Ivo, which compounded the rainfall there.

=== Tropical Storm Juliette ===
- Tropical storm (SSHWS)
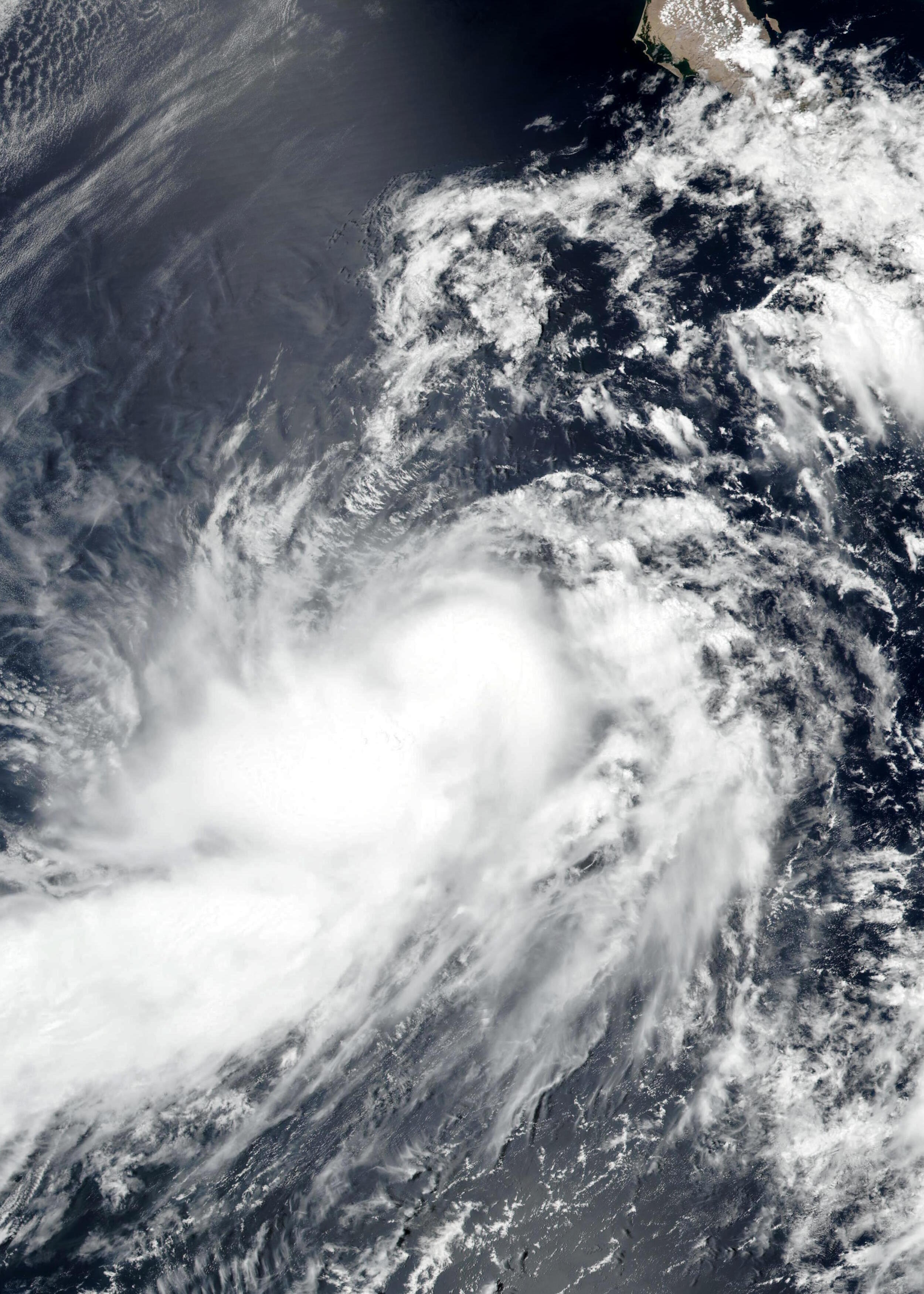
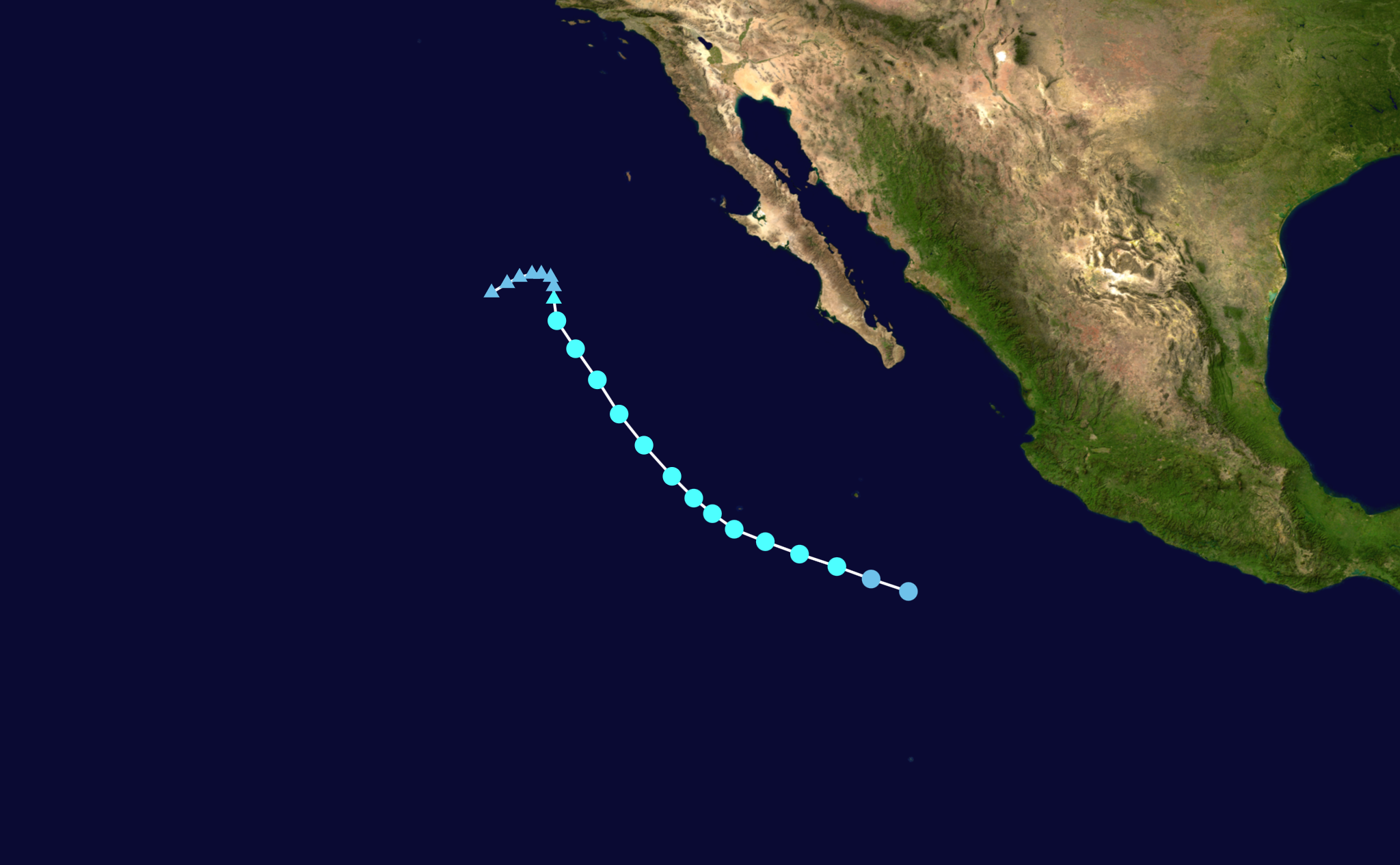
- Duration: August 24 – August 28
- Peak intensity: 70 mph (110 km/h) (1-min); 994 mbar (hPa)

On August 22, an area of low pressure associated with a tropical wave formed south of southwestern Mexico. The disturbance gradually consolidated, developing a well-defined circulation on the afternoon of August 24, to become Tropical Depression Ten‑E. The depression then organized into Tropical Storm Juliette early the following morning. Juliette moved west-northwestward on August 25, along the southwest side of a mid-level ridge. The storm continued to strengthen, as an inner core began developing, and banding features increased south of the center. Consequently, its sustained winds rose to 70 mph (110 km/h) the following morning, about 360 mi (580 km) west of Socorro Island. This peak intensity was short-lived as Juliette's structure degraded slightly later that same day due to wind shear. Further weakening occurred on August 27, as the storm moved over colder waters, then entered an area of drier air and increasing wind shear. Due to these conditions Juliette became devoid of deep convection, and degenerated into a remnant low by early the following morning. The low then dissipated early on August 30.

The remnants of the system brought light rain to southern California.

=== Hurricane Kiko ===
- Category 4 hurricane (SSHWS)
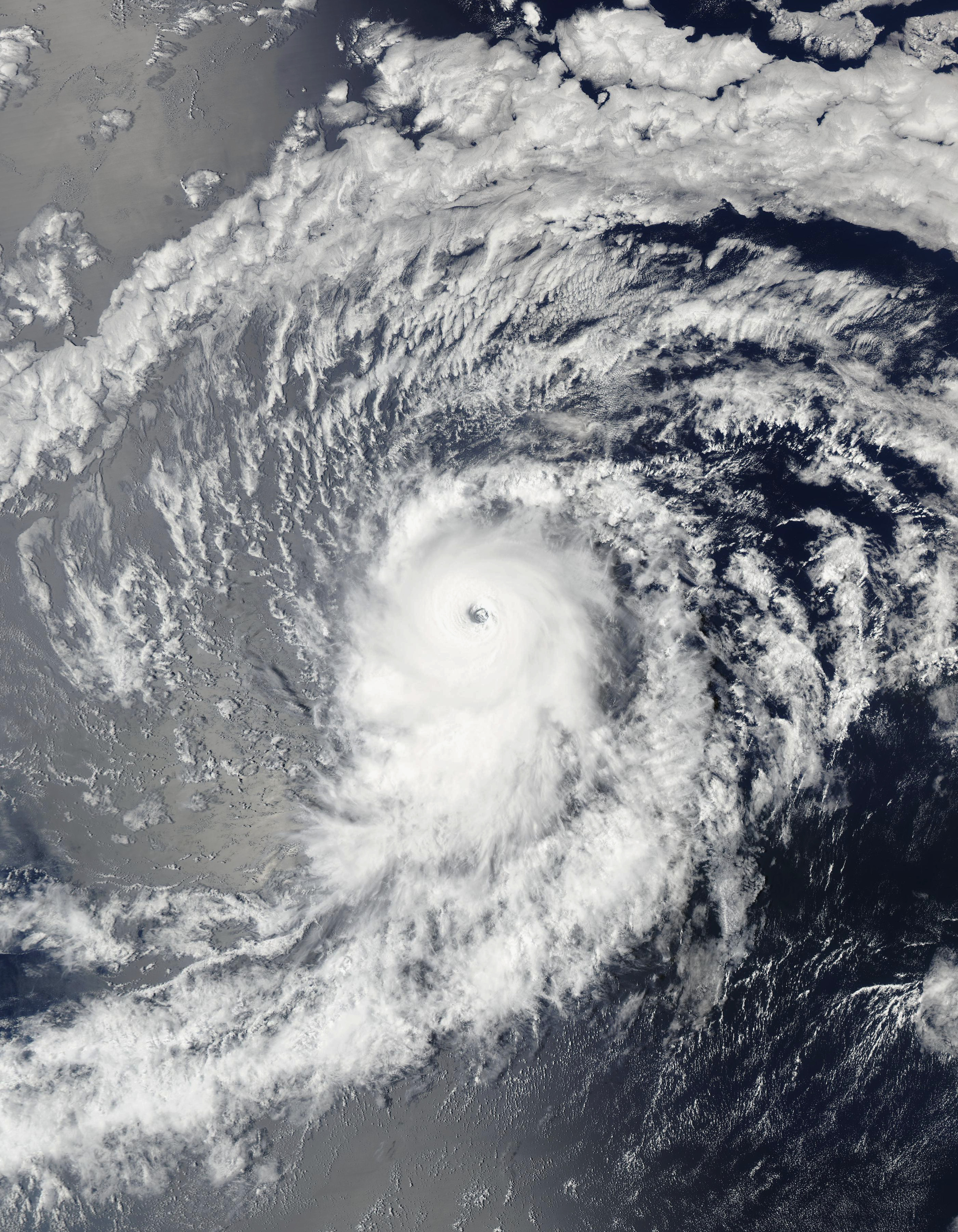
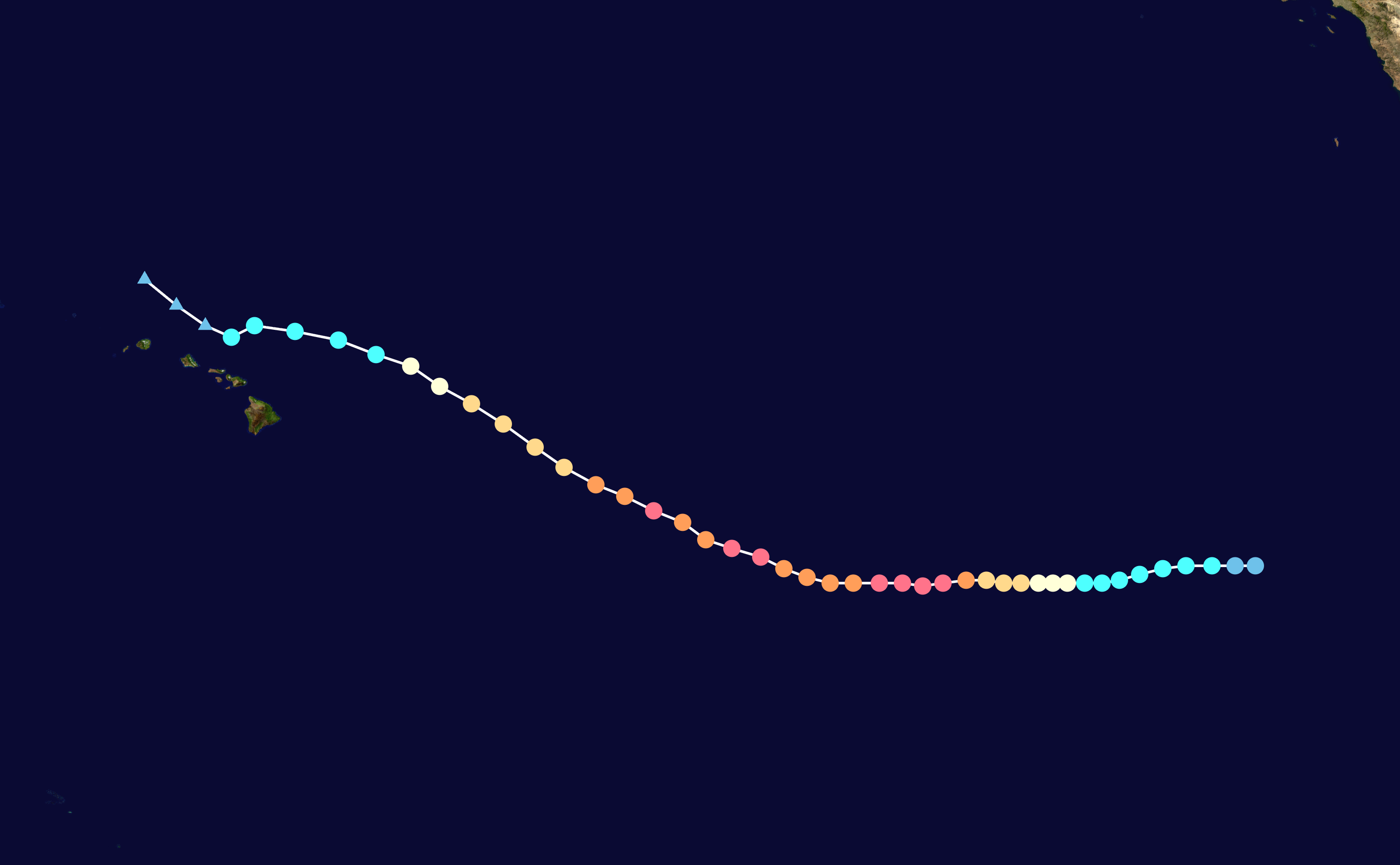
- Duration: August 31 – September 10
- Peak intensity: 145 mph (230 km/h) (1-min); 945 mbar (hPa)

On August 26, an area of low pressure developed within a tropical wave south of the coast of southern Mexico. The disturbance began showing some signs of organization a few days later, and organized into Tropical Depression Eleven‑E on the morning of August 31, about 1,000 mi (1,610 km) southwest of the southern tip of the Baja California peninsula. Moving westward, the depression strengthened into Tropical Storm Kiko a short while later. Kiko continued to become better organized throughout the following day, and on the morning of September 2, the system strengthened into a Category 1 hurricane. Kiko then intensified into a Category 2 hurricane that afternoon. Continuing along a westward track amid favorable conditions, Kiko rapidly intensified to a Category 4 hurricane on September 3. The system attained maximum sustained winds of 145 mph (230 km/h) that afternoon, while about 1,560 mi (2,510 km) east-southeast of Hilo, Hawaii. Kiko then weakened slightly overnight into the next morning. Kiko's structure then degraded considerably over the course of several hours on September 4, due to nearby dry air, and the hurricane weakened to Category 3 strength.

Early the next morning, Kiko turned to the west-northwest. Kiko's eye then cleared out and cold cloud tops again more fully encircled the core, as the system re-intensified to Category 4, attaining sustained winds of 140 mph (220 km/h) that same day, and took on some annular characteristics as it intensified. Early on September 6, the system entered the Central Pacific basin. During the day, the intensity of the storm fluctuated, first falling to Category 3, then rebounding to Category 4, then falling to Category 3 once again. The next day, as Kiko moved into cooler waters, the eye became cloud-filled and the cloud tops began to gradually warm; as a result, the hurricane weakened to Category 2. The hurricane's structure continued to degrade on September 8, and by the late in the day it had rapidly weakened to a shallow tropical storm, titled by persistent southwesterly wind shear, thus nearly devoid of deep convection. A burst of deep convection developed north of the storm's low-level center on the afternoon of September 9, but soon collapsed due to the hostile surrounding environment and Kiko degenerated into a post-tropical remnant low early the following morning north of the Hawaiian Islands. The low then dissipated early the next day.

Precipitation, rip currents, and high surf were reported in parts of Hawaii. Maui and the Big Island of Hawaiʻi received 1-2 in of rain. Waves up to 8 ft (2.4 m) were reported along the southeastern shore of Oʻahu, resulting the rescue of at least 30 people.

=== Hurricane Lorena ===
- Category 1 hurricane (SSHWS)
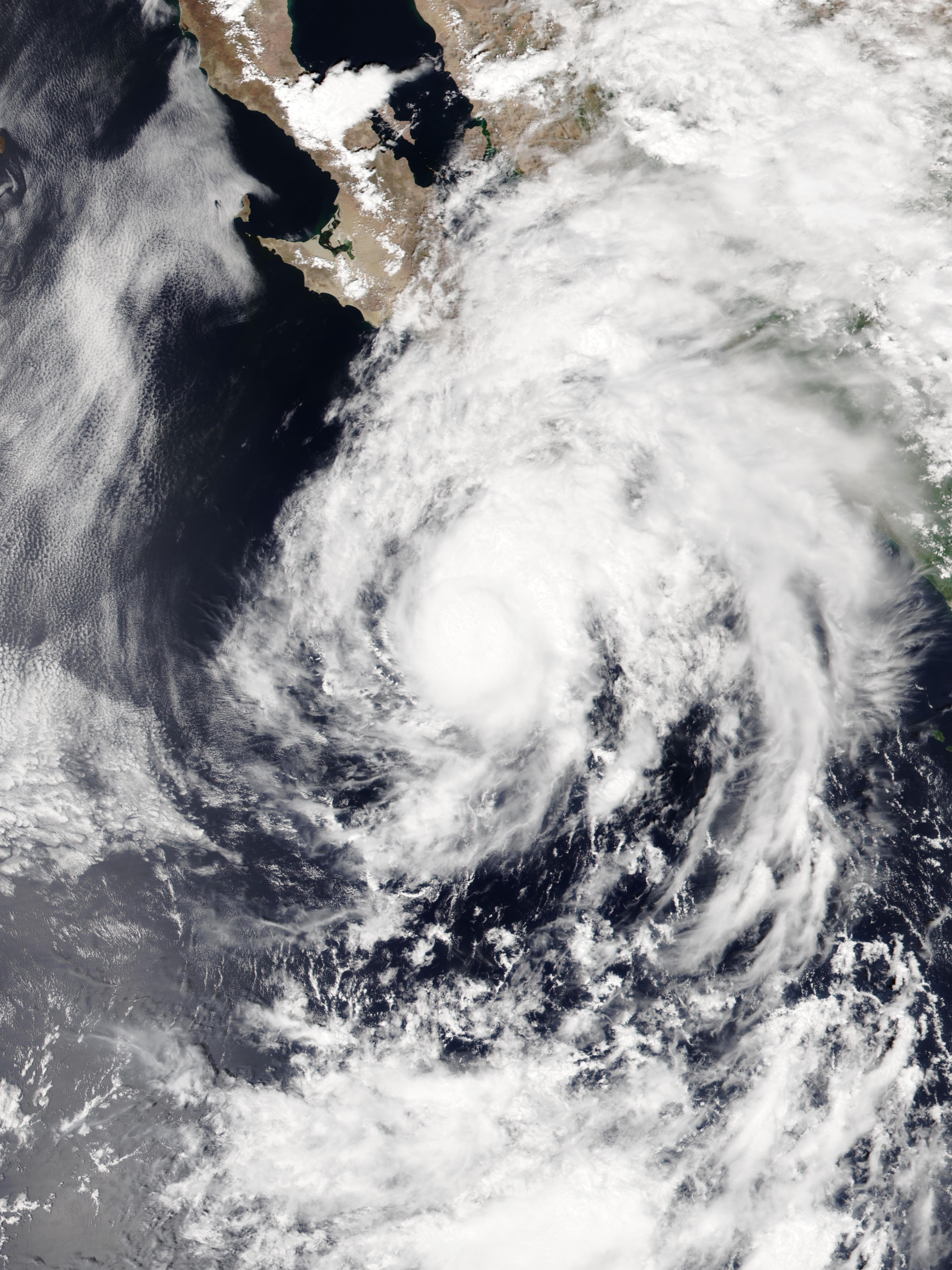
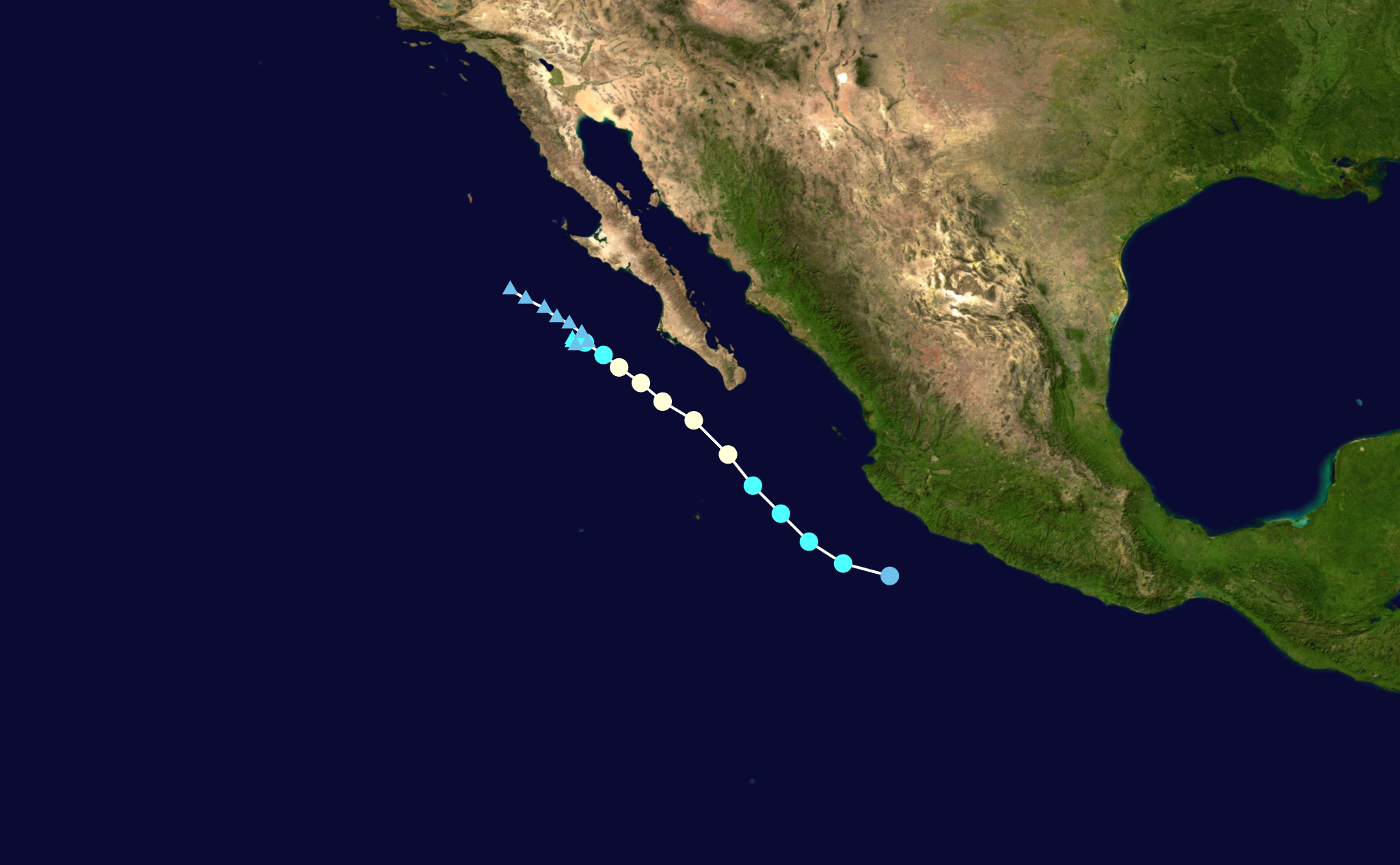
- Duration: September 2 – September 4
- Peak intensity: 85 mph (140 km/h) (1-min); 981 mbar (hPa)

On September 1, shower and thunderstorm activity associated with a tropical wave close to the coast of southwestern Mexico started to become better organized. The disturbance continued to become better organized, and was designated Tropical Depression Twelve‑E that evening. Overnight, the organization of the system's small core improved, and it intensified into Tropical Storm Lorena the following morning. This trend continued, and on the morning of September 3, Lorena intensified into a Category 1 hurricane. Late that day, the system attained maximum sustained winds of 85 mph (140 km/h) about 210 mi (340 km) west of Cabo San Lucas, Baja California Sur. By the following morning, however, the system had entered a less favorable environment of cooler waters and increasing windshear. As a result, it weakened to tropical storm strength. Weakening continued, and the storm degenerated into a remnant low early on September 5, offshore of Baja California Sur. The remnant low dissipated two days later.

Persistent rains in Sonora resulted in small stream and coastal flooding. Heavy rainfall resulting in flooding was also reported in Baja California Sur. A total of 113 mm (4.45 in) of rain fell in San José del Cabo, Baja California Sur. A man drowned in Tepic, Nayarit, as a result of urban flooding. Lorena's remnants fueled thunderstorms over Arizona, New Mexico, California, and Texas. Strong winds damaged several structures and heavy rainfall flooded several roads. Damage throughout the states totaled to US$1.81 million.

=== Tropical Storm Mario ===
- Tropical storm (SSHWS)
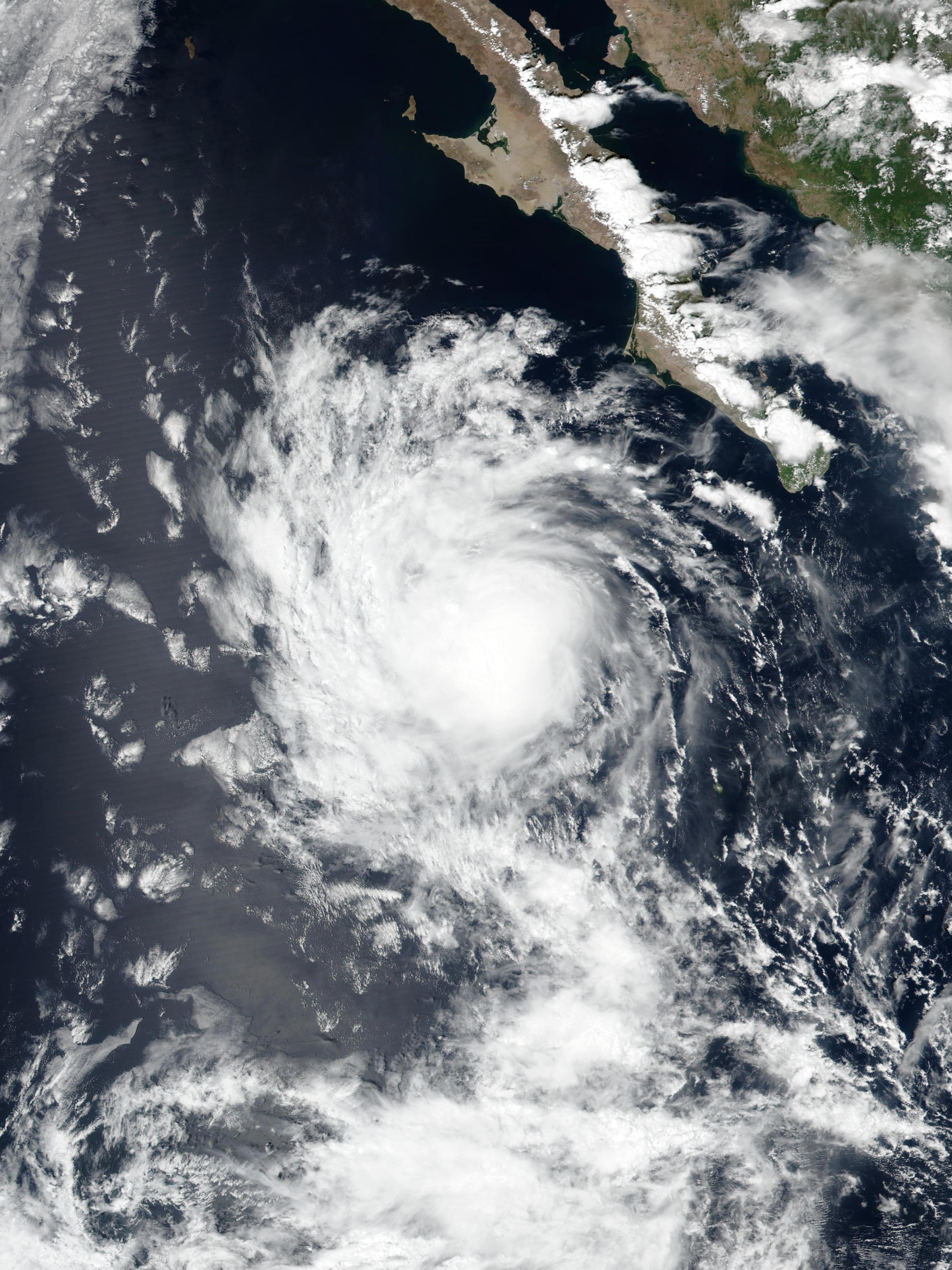
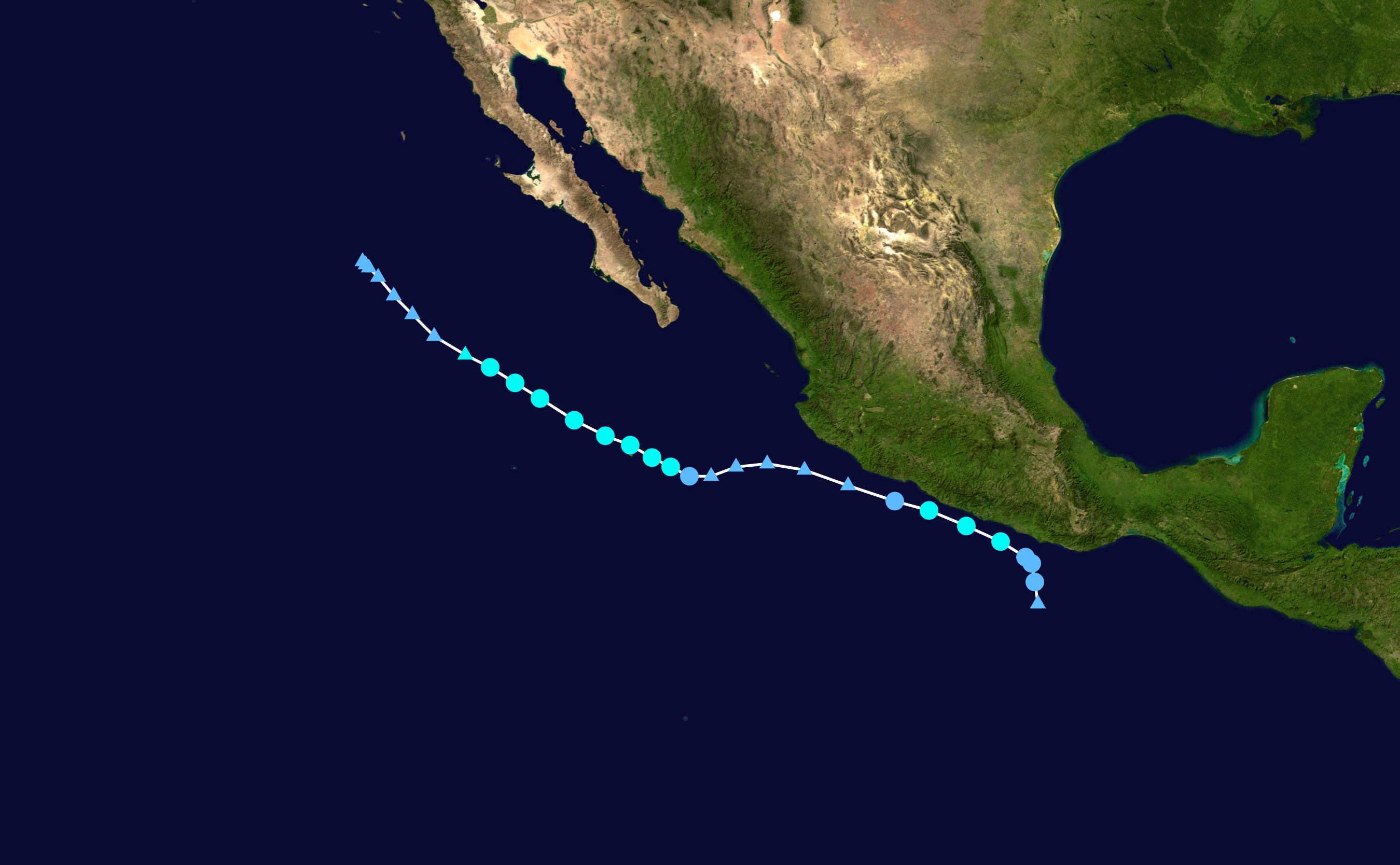
- Duration: September 11 – September 16
- Peak intensity: 65 mph (100 km/h) (1-min); 994 mbar (hPa)

On September 8, a tropical wave entered the far eastern Pacific from Central America. The disturbance began showing signs of organization on September 10, as it tracked just offshore of the coast of southern Mexico, and was designated Tropical Depression Thirteen-E the following afternoon. As the depression tracked west-northwestward on the morning of September 12, it strengthened into Tropical Storm Mario about 25 mi (35 km) off the coast of Guerrero. Later that day, a large low-pressure area began developing to the south of Mario, which caused Mario to weaken into a tropical depression. Weakening continued throughout the night, and Mario degenerated into a remnant low early on September 13. The remnants of Mario continued to produce disorganized convection as it moved slowly westward through the day. Convection organized and deepened, and by the next morning, a well-defined circulation had reformed. As a result, Mario redeveloped as a tropical storm just southeast of Socorro Island. During the afternoon of September 15, the storm tracked northwestward, moving between a mid-level ridge over northern Mexico and a mid-level low to its northwest, and attained sustained winds of 65 mph (100 km/h). Later that day, however, a weakening trend began as Mario moved into cooler waters. The storm weakened into a tropical depression on the afternoon of September 16, about 495 mi (800 km) west of the southern point of the Baja California peninsula, and later degenerated into a remnant low. The low then dissipated on September 18.

Flooding was reported in Acapulco. The outer rain bands from the system also triggered heavy flash flooding in Baja California Sur. Several homes, vehicles, and roads were damaged by floodwaters. At least 50 families were affected by flooding. In San Ignacio, a 37-year-old man was electrocuted during the passage of the storm. The remnants of Mario also prompted flood and flash flood warnings throughout Central and Southern California. The remnants of Mario prompted flood and flash flood warnings throughout Central and Southern California. Thunderstorms were also reported, with over nine thousand lightning strikes recorded. At least 7,000 people lost power during the storm. In Barstow, floodwaters swept away a vehicle, killing a toddler. Across California, heavy rain triggered numerous landslides, leaving several vehicles stranded. Caltrans launched a $9.7 million project to repair the damage caused by Mario on California State Route 38. Officials estimated total road damage and the cost to repair the damage at US$40.7 million. At Death Valley National Park, several roads were closed and there was severe flooding in the park, with a quarter of the park's annual precipitation falling during the storm. Rainfall at Harry Reid International Airport in Las Vegas reached .24 inches (6.1 mm), the wettest day at the airport since May 6.

=== Hurricane Narda ===
- Category 2 hurricane (SSHWS)
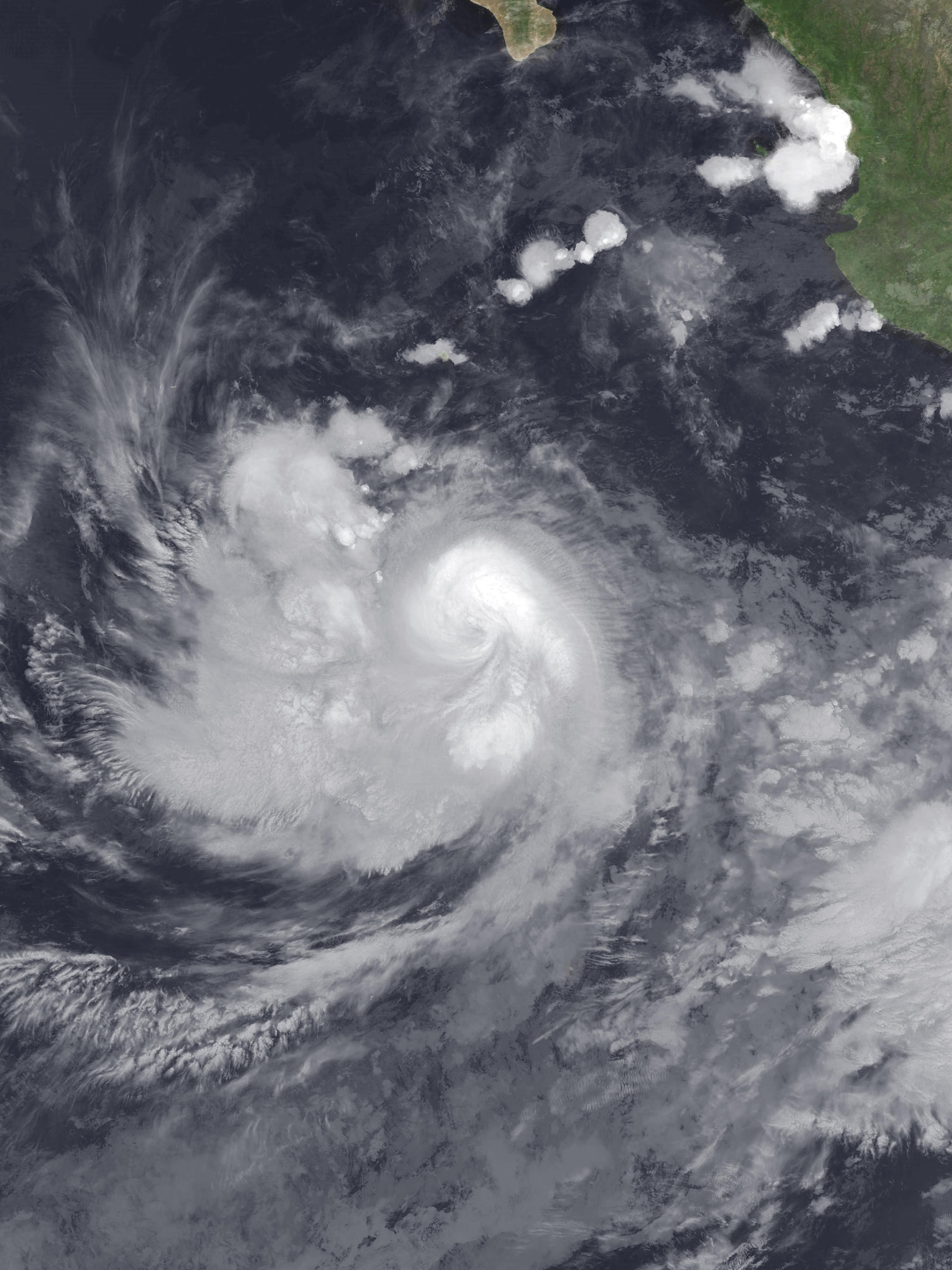
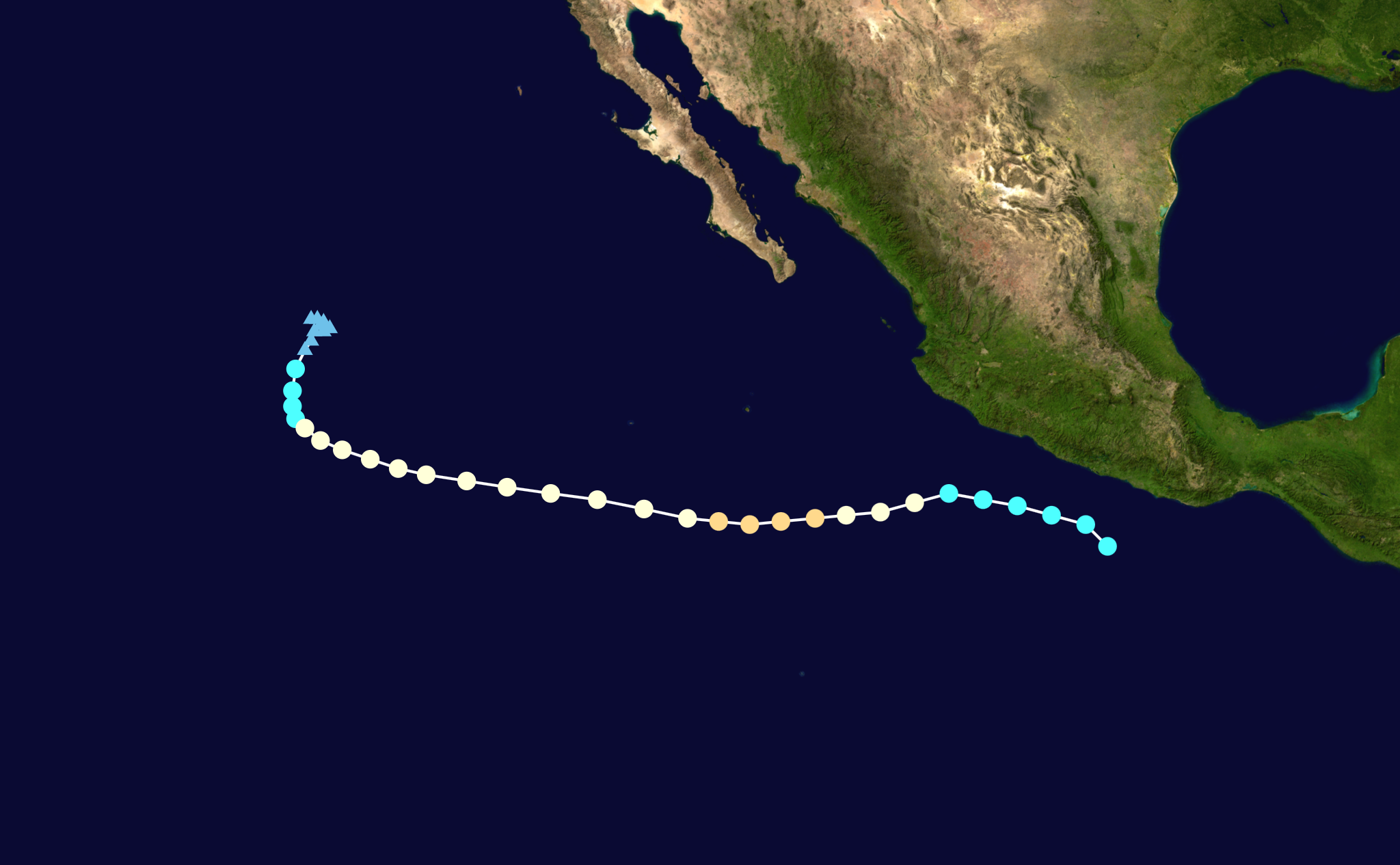
- Duration: September 21 – September 28
- Peak intensity: 105 mph (165 km/h) (1-min); 970 mbar (hPa)

Between September 17 and 18, a tropical wave crossed Central America. The wave combined with an area of disturbed weather and became Tropical Storm Narda on September 21 at 18:00 UTC, 210 mi (340 km) south-southeast of Zihuatanejo. Narda moved west-northwest due to the influence of a mid-level ridge over northern Mexico. An environment characterized by warm sea surface temperatures and low wind shear allowed Narda to strengthen, developing an inner central core while turning west. On September 23 at 06:00 UTC, Narda strengthened into a Category 1 hurricane. Narda continued to strengthen, with convection increasing and peaked as a Category 2 hurricane with maximum sustained winds of 105 mph (165 km/h) and a minimum central pressure of 970 mbar (28.64 inHg) on September 24 at 06:00 UTC. However, strong east-northeasterly wind shear caused Narda to weaken to a Category 1 hurricane on September 25 at 00:00 UTC. Narda maintained this intensity due to warm sea surface temperatures. On September 27, Narda began to contend with dry air intrusion while turning north. Increasing wind shear, dry air, and cooler sea surface temperatures caused Narda begin a quick weakening trend. Early the next day, Narda was downgraded to a tropical storm. Convection within the system collapsed and Narda degenerated to a remnant low on September 28 at 18:00 UTC. The remnant low later dissipated on October 1 at 06:00 UTC.

Heavy rainfall of Narda caused flooding across the Pacific coast of Mexico. In Chiapas, Narda caused flash flooding, mudslides, road damage, and power outages. Damage was reported across 32 municipalities, 11 bridges, and 26 sections of roadways. In Oaxaca, at least two rivers overflowed. In Santa María Jacatepec, a 76-year-old man drowned after swept away by an overflowing river. An elderly woman had to be evacuated from her flooded home. Public transportation routes to the Acapulco International Airport were disrupted as a result of the rains. In Costa Chica Region of Guerrero, heavy rains caused river rises and high surf. In Acapulco, homes were inundated in the Diamante neighborhood and rockslides were reported on roadways. Fourteen boats capsized and six classes were suspended. Several residents were evacuated after a landslide fell onto a housing complex. A wall collapsed due to heavy rains. Public transportation lines were suspended. In Barra Vieja, a man drowned after being swept away by an overflowing river. In Acaponeta, Nayarit, at least 250 homes were flooded. More than 20 families fled to shelters. Damage was reported across at least seven municipalities, isolating several communities. In Tepic, Nayarit, two people were killed after their home was buried in a landslide. In Tlaquepaque, Jalisco, a man was killed after being buried by a landslide. In Guadalajara, a woman was rescued after falling into a sinkhole. Flooding swept away several vehicles. The remnants of Narda brought high surf to Newport Beach, California, resulting in more than 80 rescues.

=== Hurricane Octave ===
- Category 1 hurricane (SSHWS)
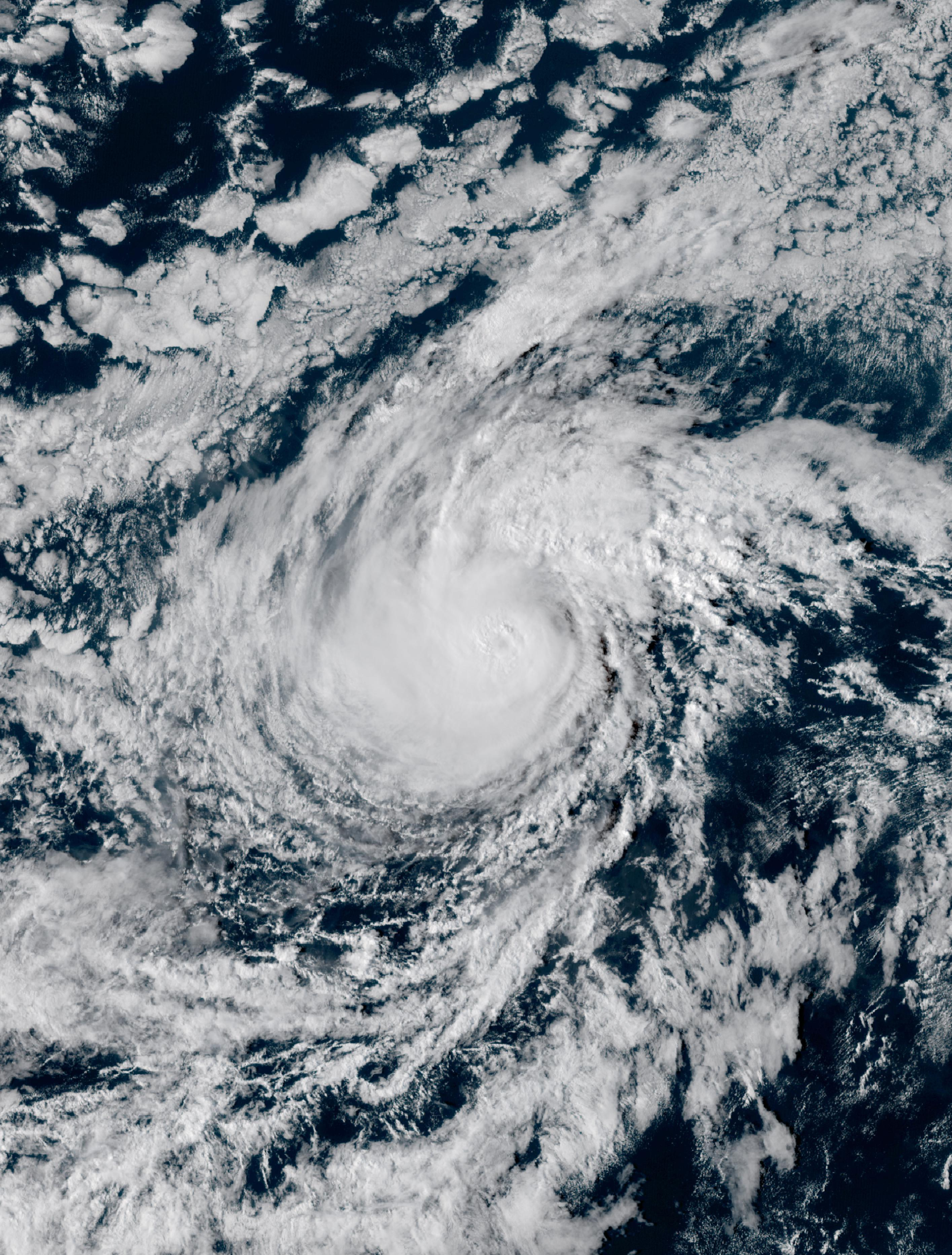
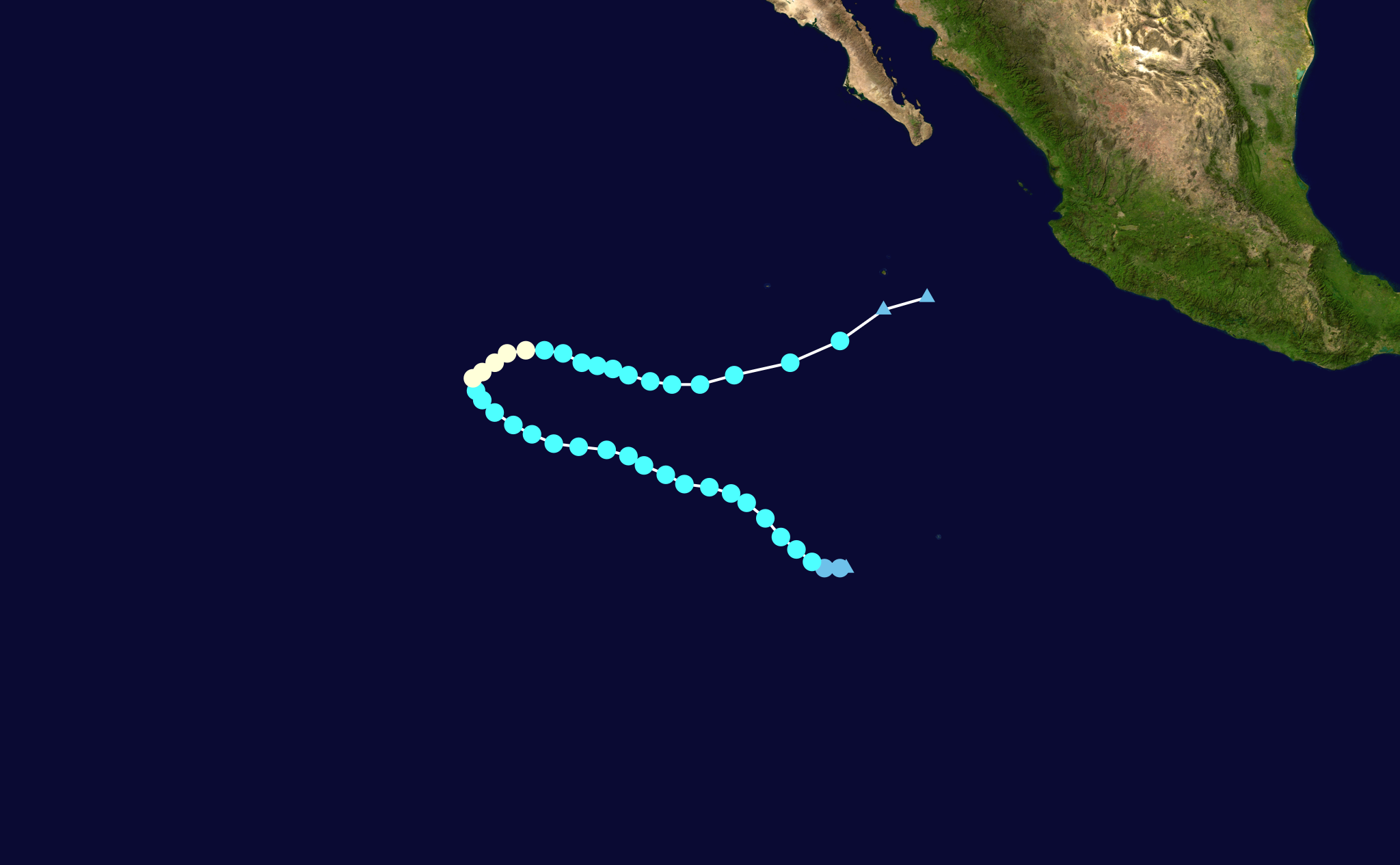
- Duration: September 30 – October 9
- Peak intensity: 90 mph (150 km/h) (1-min); 980 mbar (hPa)

On September 28, an area of low pressure associated with a tropical wave well offshore of southwest Mexico started to become better organized. The disturbance became Tropical Depression Fifteen-E early on the morning of September 30, then soon strengthened, becoming Tropical Storm Octave. As Octave moved north-northwestward the following day, it continued strengthening due to a slight decrease in vertical wind shear, with its winds reaching 65 mph (100 km/h). However, after it made a slight turn to the west-northwest, significant amounts of wind shear once again affected the storm, and it weakened slightly on October 2. Weakening continued into the morning of October 3 as Octave's low-level center became exposed. The wind shear began relaxing that night, permitting Octave to begin restrengthening. The storm turned northwestward the following day. On October 5, the storm turned to the north; then, while drifting slowly northeastward, Octave strengthened into a Category 1 hurricane. After attaining sustained winds of 90 mph (150 km/h) later that day, Octave weakened back to tropical storm early on October 6. Octave generated sporadic bursts of deep convection over the next few days, while battling persistent strong wind shear as it moved east-northeastward, bringing it south of Hurricane Priscilla, and near a developing tropical cyclone (Tropical Storm Raymond). Octave succumbed to the hostile environment early on October 9, degenerating into a remnant low and dissipating early the next day.

=== Hurricane Priscilla ===
- Category 3 hurricane (SSHWS)
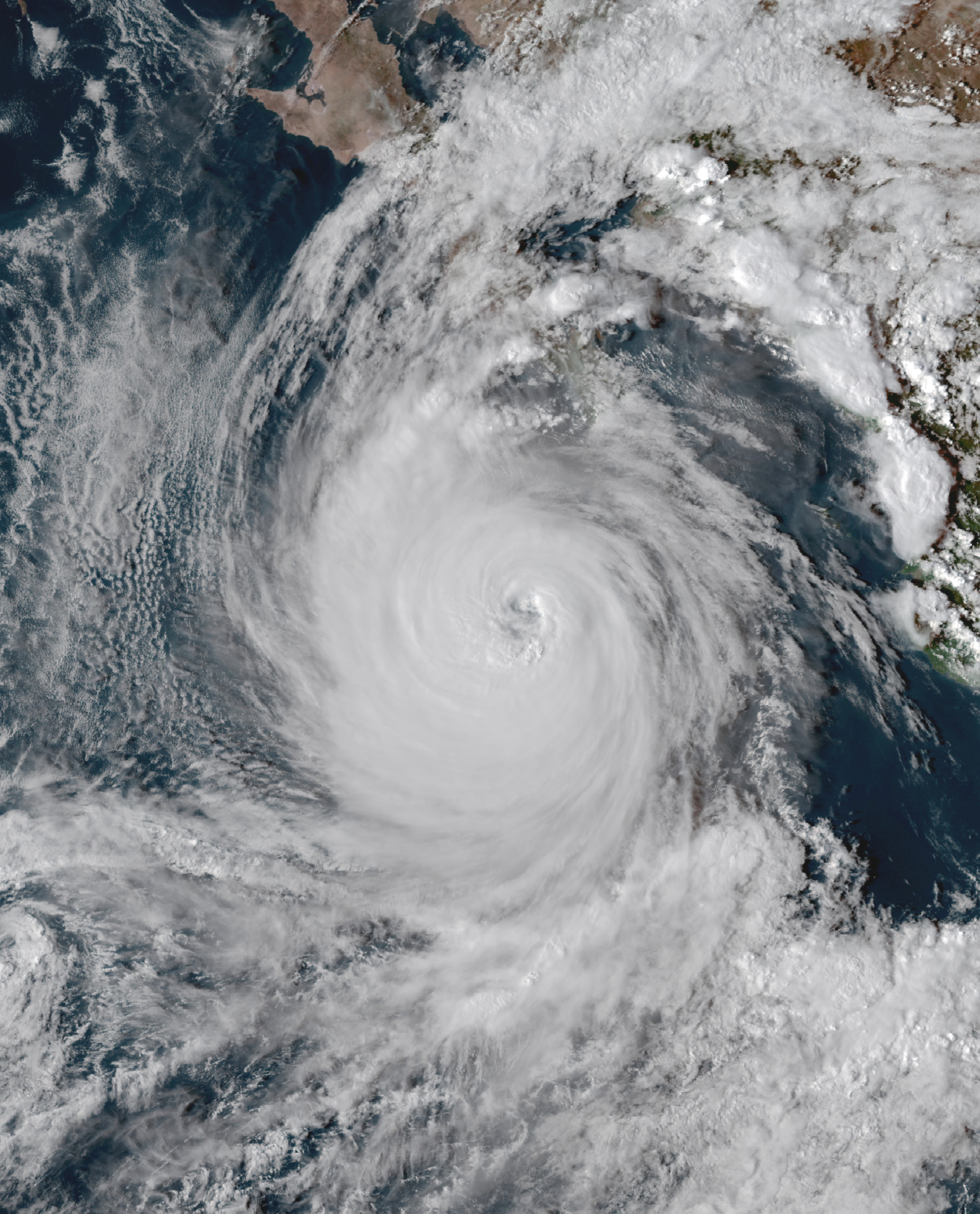
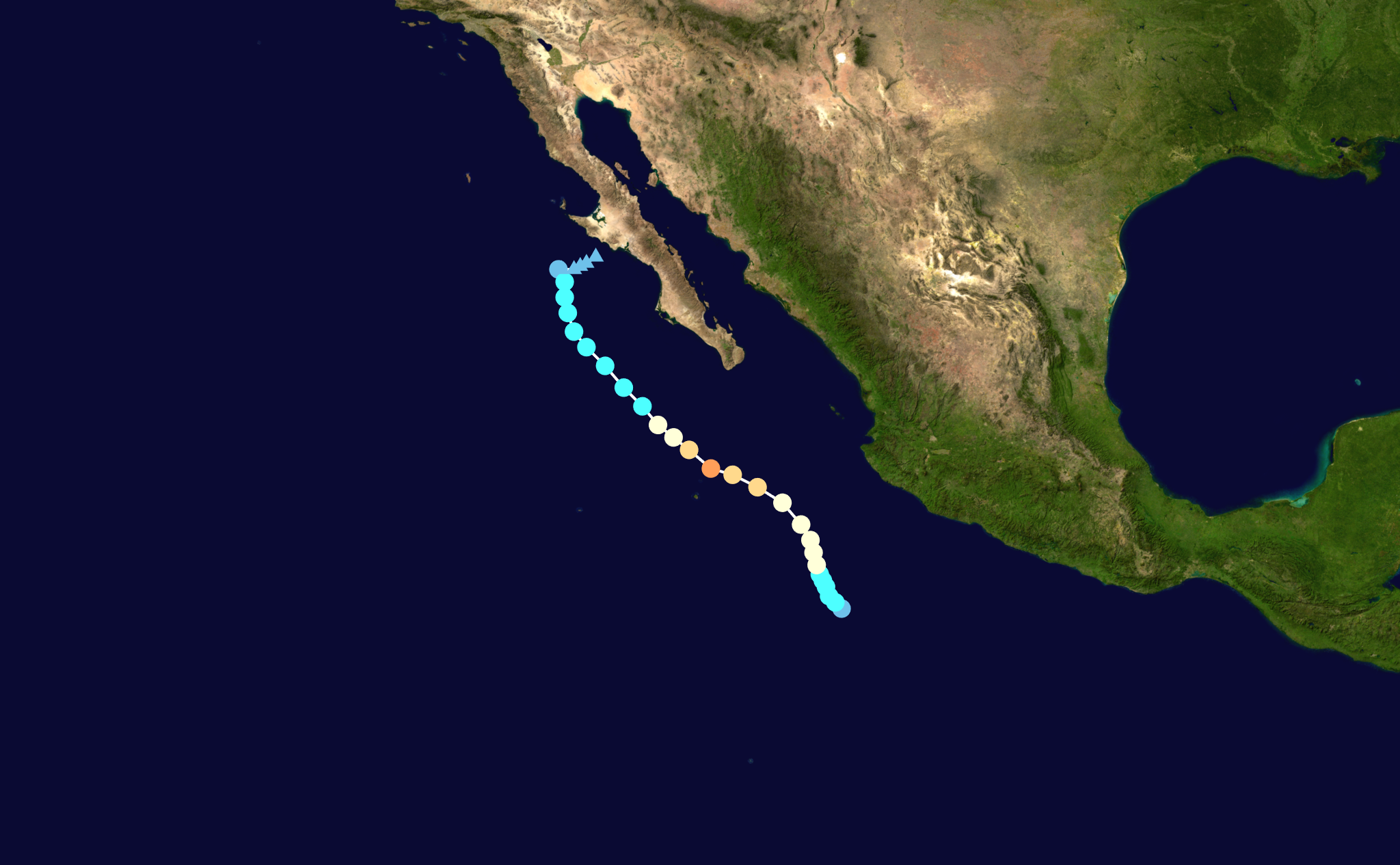
- Duration: October 4 – October 10
- Peak intensity: 115 mph (185 km/h) (1-min); 954 mbar (hPa)

On October 1, an area of low pressure formed offshore of southwest Mexico. The disturbance showed increasing signs of organization over the following couple of days, and developed into Tropical Storm Priscilla on the afternoon of October 4. Priscilla gradually strengthened throughout the remainder of that day while drifting roughly north-northwestward due largely to light steering currents. Priscilla became a Category 1 hurricane on October 5, then reached Category 3 strength on October 7, attaining sustained winds of 115 mph (185 km/h), while tracking slowly to the northwest, about 215 mi (345 km) south of the southern tip of the Baja California peninsula. Later that same day, Priscilla began to weaken due to upwelling of cool water. The system weakened to tropical storm strength on October 8, as it moved into an increasingly dry environment, and surrounding water temperatures decreased sharply. The storm generated sporadic deep convection over the next couple days, before degenerating into a remnant low on October 10.

In Oaxaca, flooded homes and drainage collapses were reported. In Baja California Sur, Jalisco, and Nayarit, flooded roads, fallen trees, power outages, and stranded vehicles were reported. In Puerto Vallarta, wind gusts of 40-70 km/h were reported. Swells from Priscilla flooded sixteen businesses and capsized two small boats. However, overall damage was minor. A turtle sanctuary was partially destroyed. Two people were reported missing in the state. A family was rescued from their stranded vehicle. In La Paz, Baja California Sur, up to 250 mm (9.8 in) of rain fell. A man was rescued after being swept away by an overflowing river. A clinic was flooded and four flights were cancelled due to bad weather. In Nayarit, coastal flooding damaged 66 homes and several beach huts. Flooding caused the suspension of classes across ten municipalities. In San Blas, restaurants were inundated by storm surge. In Colima, a man was rescued after being swept out to sea by rough surf. More than 100 people were evacuated from damaged areas. In Sinaloa, fifteen palapas were damaged by storm surge. Remnant moisture caused heavy rain in the Southwestern United States. Flooding in Mesa, Arizona, forced portions of US 60 to close. At least two vehicles were swept away due to flooding in New Mexico. Further north, over 2 in (51 mm) of rain flooded Grand Junction, Colorado, also setting daily rainfall records. Flooding in La Plata County resulted in over 390 homes being evacuated. In Utah, four hikers in Big Cottonwood Canyon were injured, and rainfall in the state peaked at 5.15 in (131 mm) in New Harmony. Snowfall was also reported in the Wasatch Range, in the western part of the state. Remnant moisture from Priscilla caused a fatality in the Las Vegas Valley. Damage in Nevada and Arizona totaled to US$58,000. Despite flood damage in Colorado, president Donald Trump denied Jared Polis's request for FEMA aid, a move which Democrats claim was politically motivated.

=== Tropical Storm Raymond ===
- Tropical storm (SSHWS)
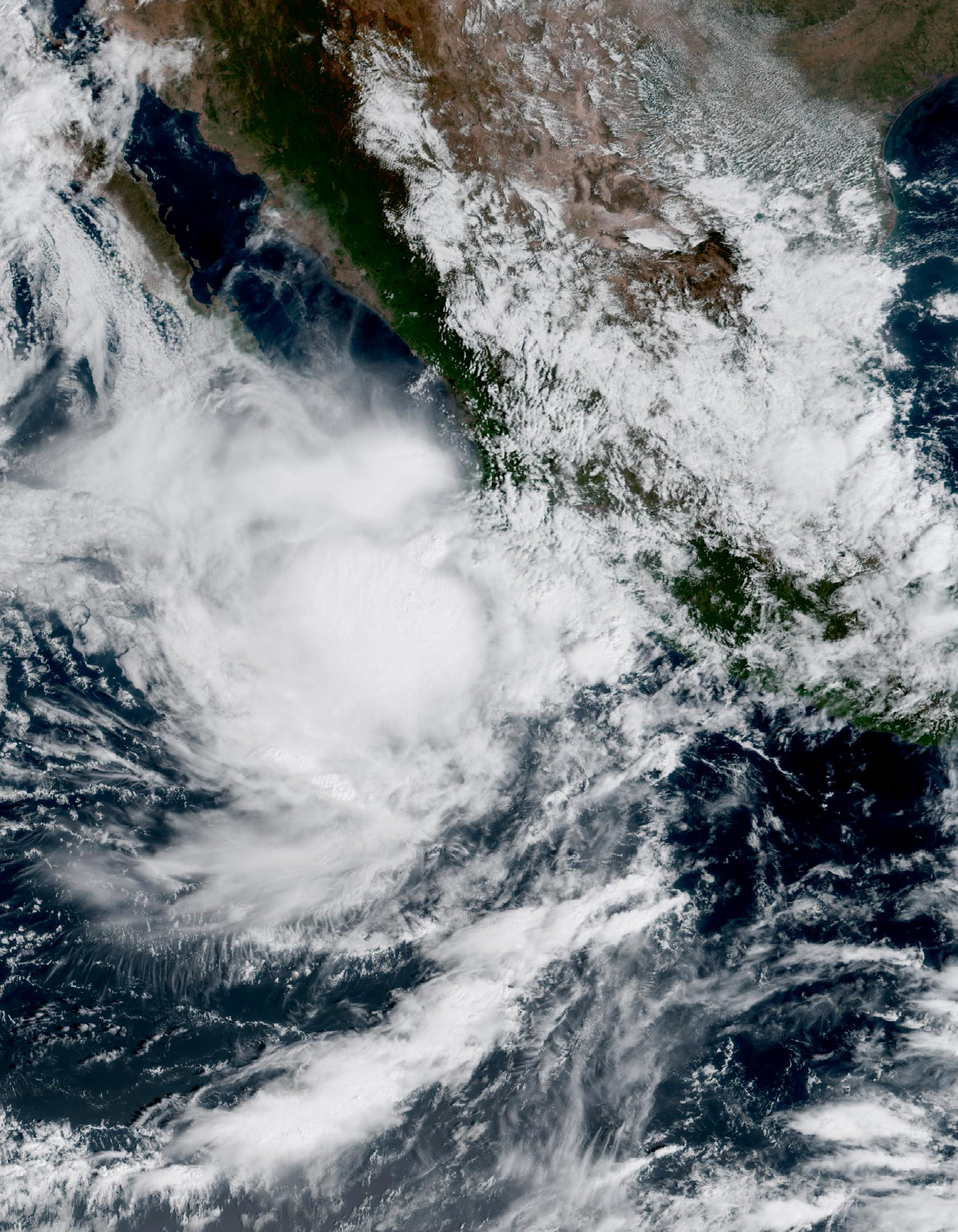
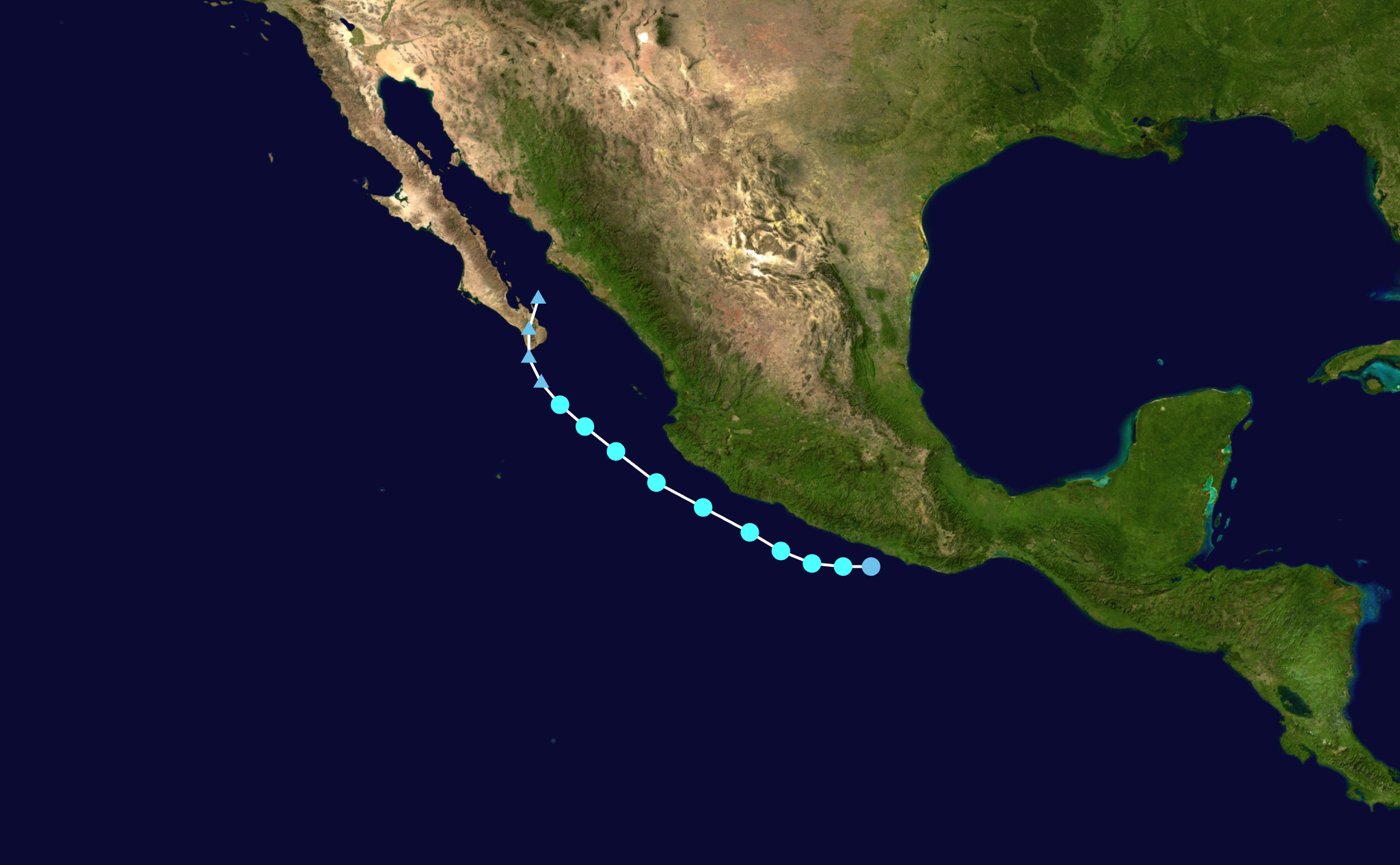
- Duration: October 9 – October 11
- Peak intensity: 60 mph (95 km/h) (1-min); 998 mbar (hPa)

On October 6, a broad area of low pressure formed off the coast of Guatemala. On the morning of October 9, the low gained some organization, and was designated Tropical Depression Seventeen-E by the NHC. The system organized further later that day, becoming Tropical Storm Raymond. Raymond tracked to the west-northwest, remaining just off the coast of southwestern Mexico, and battling strong easterly wind shear, factors that hindered the storm's potential to strengthen. Raymond attained peak winds of 60 mph (95 km/h) early on October 10, about 120 mi (195 km) west of Zihuatanejo, Guerrero. The next day, dry air and wind shear caused Raymond to weaken into a tropical depression, then degenerate into a remnant low off the coast of the Baja California peninsula. The low then dissipated the next day.

The trough of low pressure that spawned Raymond caused heavy rainfall in El Salvador. In San Salvador, a 32-year-old woman was killed after being buried by a landslide. In Oaxaca, flooding and mudslides were reported. At least three people were killed, and two others were injured. In Guerrero, at least 50 homes were flooded. In Zihuatanejo, a total of 151 mm (5.94 in) of rain fell. In Puerto Vallarta, at least 700 homes and 85 businesses were flooded. A local university was damaged, with losses estimated at Mex$5 million (US$270,000). There, one person was found dead after the passage of the storm. A man was injured after being electrocuted. In Sonora, the remnants of Raymond triggered flooding, sweeping five vehicles away. Additionally, moisture from Raymond's remnants, combined with remnant moisture from Hurricane Priscilla, caused flash flooding across central and southeastern Mexico that caused at least 64 fatalities. Additionally, Raymond brought moderate rainfall to New Mexico, peaking at 0.95 in (24 mm) in Grants. A flash flood emergency was also issued in Pinal County, Arizona. In Arizona, one person drowned after their vehicle was swept away by floodwaters. Damage statewide totaled to US$5.9 million.

=== Tropical Storm Sonia ===
- Tropical storm (SSHWS)
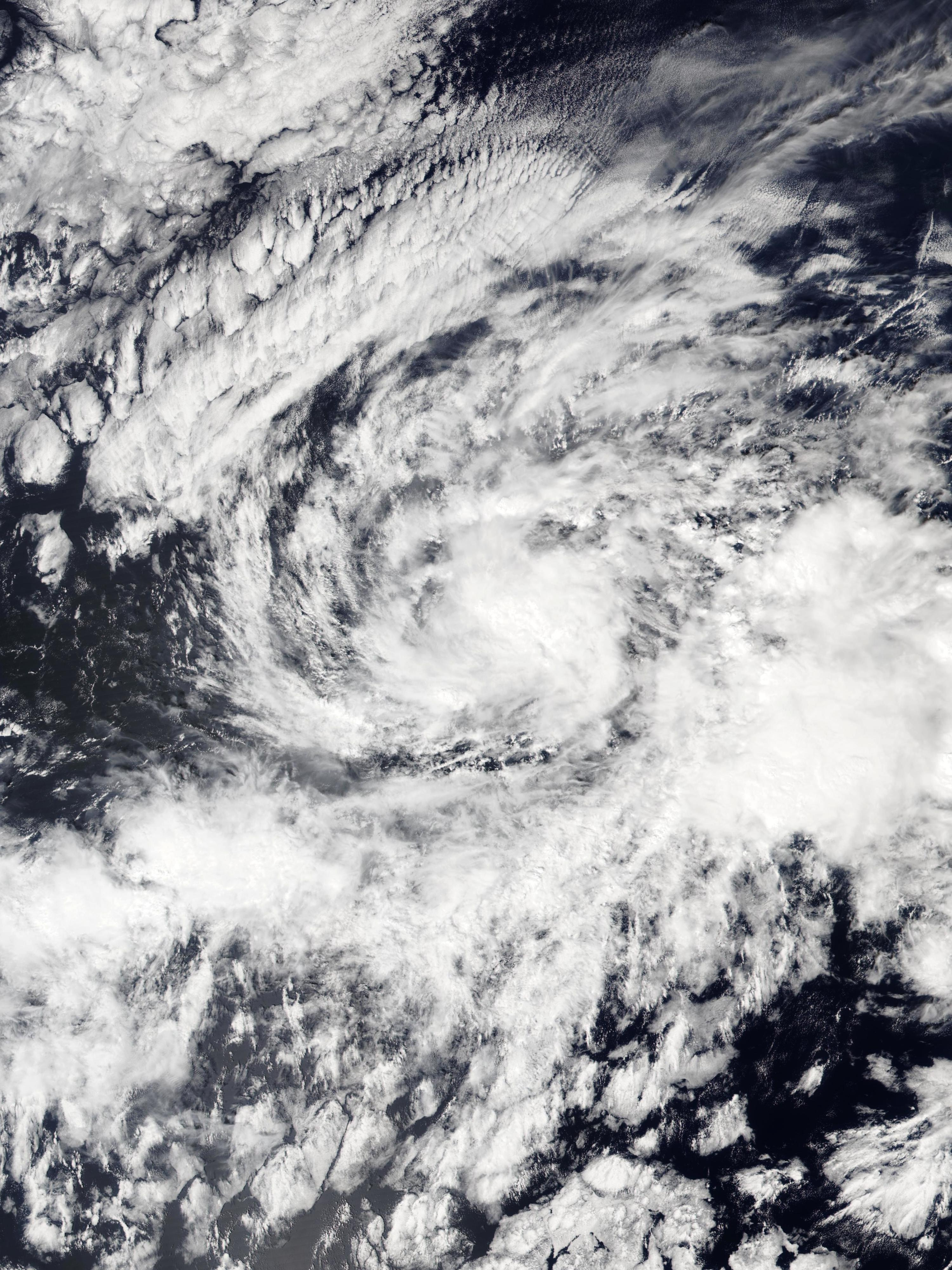
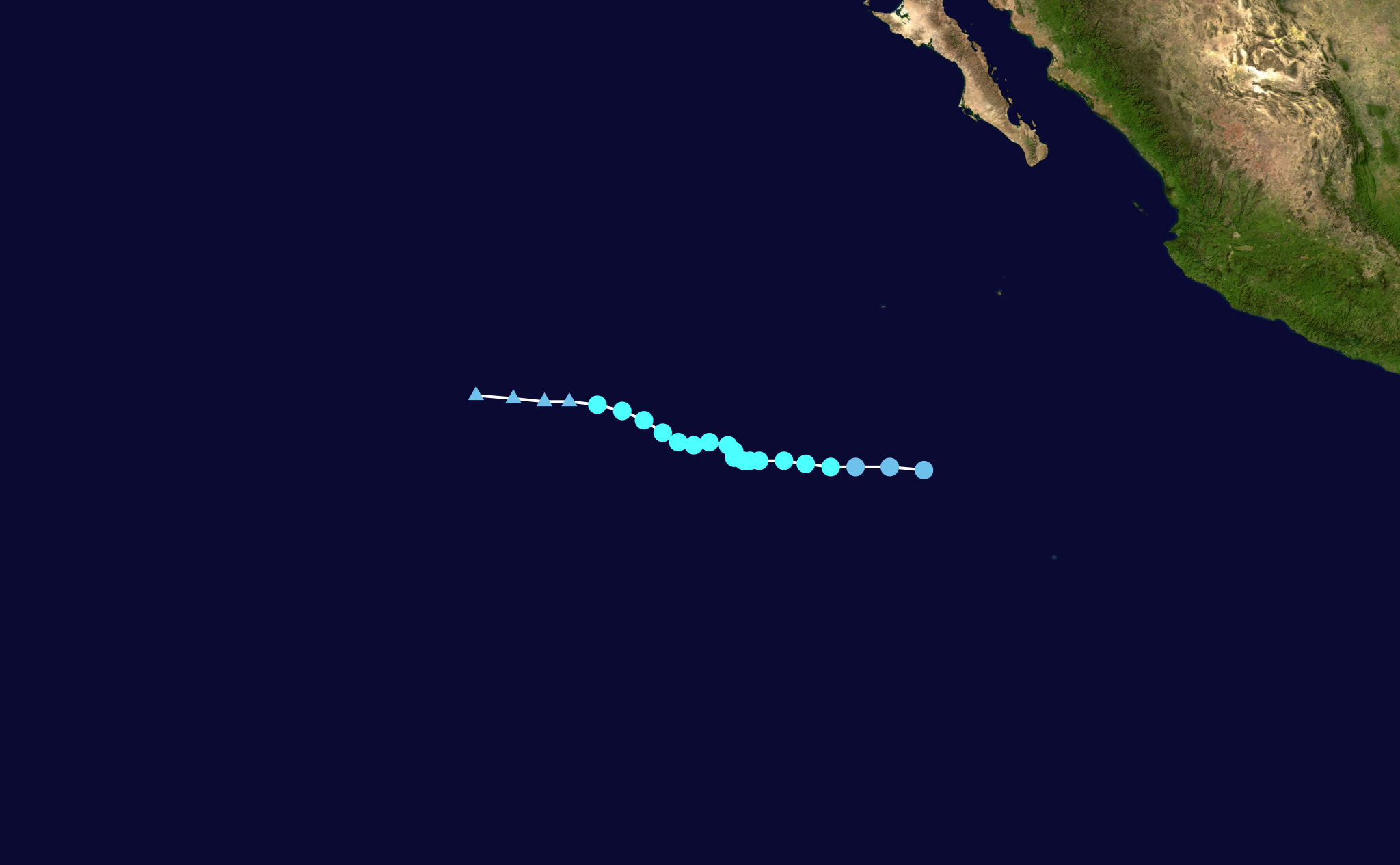
- Duration: October 24 – October 28
- Peak intensity: 50 mph (85 km/h) (1-min); 1001 mbar (hPa)

On October 23, showers and thunderstorms associated with a tropical wave located far south of the Baja California peninsula began showing signs of increasing organization. The following afternoon, the disturbance acquired a well-defined circulation center, and became designated Tropical Depression Eighteen‑E by the NHC. Later, as deep convection expanded over the low-level center and cloud-top temperatures cooled, the system strengthened into Tropical Storm Sonia early on October 25. Sonia attained peak winds of 50 mph (85 km/h) that same day, about 840 mi (1,350 km) southwest of the southern tip of the Baja California peninsula. Moving slowly west-northwestward the next day, Sonia entered into an increasingly unfavorable environment with moderate wind shear, cooler water temperatures, and a drier more stable airmass. Sonia gradually weakened over the next several days, turned to the west, then degenerated into a remnant low late on October 28 and dissipated the next day.

== Storm names ==
The following list of names was used for named storms that form in the North Pacific Ocean east of 140°W during 2025. This is the same list used in the 2019 season. There were no names retired following the 2025 season, so the same list will be used again for the 2031 season.

- Alvin
- Barbara
- Cosme
- Dalila
- Erick
- Flossie
- Gil
- Henriette *
- Ivo
- Juliette
- Kiko *
- Lorena
- Mario
- Narda
- Octave
- Priscilla
- Raymond
- Sonia
- Tico (unused)
- Velma (unused)
- Wallis (unused)
- Xina (unused)
- York (unused)
- Zelda (unused)

For storms that formed in the North Pacific from 140°W to the International Date Line, the names come from a series of four rotating lists. Names are used one after the other without regard to year, and when the bottom of one list is reached, the next named storm receives the name at the top of the next list. Two named storms, listed below, formed within the area in 2025. Named storms in the table above that crossed into the area during the season are noted (*).

- Iona
- Keli

The name Iona was used for the first time this season, replacing Iwa, which was retired after the 1982 season.

== Season effects ==
This is a table of all of the storms that formed in the 2025 Pacific hurricane season. It includes their duration, names, intensities, areas affected, damages, and death totals. Deaths in parentheses are additional and indirect (an example of an indirect death would be a traffic accident), but were still related to that storm. Damage and deaths include totals while the storm was extratropical, a wave, or a low, and all of the damage figures are in 2025 USD.

Saffir–Simpson scale
TD	TS	C1	C2	C3	C4	C5

2025 Pacific hurricane season season statistics
Storm name	Dates active	Storm category at peak intensity	Max 1-min wind mph (km/h)	Min. press. (mbar)	Areas affected	Damage (US$)	Deaths	Ref(s).
Alvin	May 28–31	Tropical storm	60 (95)	999	Northern Central America, Western Mexico, Baja California peninsula	>$100,000	2	
Barbara	June 8–10	Category 1 hurricane	75 (120)	991	Southwestern Mexico	Minimal	None	
Cosme	June 8–11	Tropical storm	70 (110)	991	None	None	None	
Dalila	June 13–15	Tropical storm	65 (100)	992	Western Mexico	$39.4 million	1	
Erick	June 17–20	Category 4 hurricane	140 (220)	944	Central America, Southern Mexico, Southwestern Mexico	$350 million	24	
Flossie	June 29 – July 3	Category 3 hurricane	120 (195)	958	Southwestern Mexico, Revillagigedo Islands	Minimal	1	
Iona	July 27 – August 1	Category 4 hurricane	130 (215)	956	None	None	None	
Keli	July 28–30	Tropical storm	50 (85)	1003	None	None	None	
Gil	July 31 – August 3	Category 1 hurricane	75 (120)	991	None	None	None	
Henriette	August 4–13	Category 1 hurricane	85 (140)	986	None	None	None	
Ivo	August 6–11	Tropical storm	65 (100)	998	Western Mexico, Revillagigedo Islands, Baja California peninsula	>$58,000	None	
Juliette	August 24–28	Tropical storm	70 (110)	994	Clarion Island, Southern California	None	None	
Kiko	August 31 – September 10	Category 4 hurricane	145 (230)	945	Hawaii	Minimal	None	
Lorena	September 2–4	Category 1 hurricane	85 (140)	981	Baja California peninsula, Western Mexico	$1 million	None	
Mario	September 11–16	Tropical storm	65 (100)	994	Southern Mexico, Southwestern Mexico, Revillagigedo Islands, Baja California peninsula, Southwestern United States	$40.7 million	2	
Narda	September 21–28	Category 2 hurricane	105 (165)	970	Western Mexico	Unknown	5	
Octave	September 30 – October 9	Category 1 hurricane	90 (150)	980	None	None	None	
Priscilla	October 4–10	Category 3 hurricane	115 (185)	954	Southwestern Mexico, West-Central Mexico, Revillagigedo Islands, Baja California peninsula, Southwestern United States	>$58,000	1	
Raymond	October 9–11	Tropical storm	60 (95)	998	Northern Central America, Southwestern Mexico, Baja California peninsula	>$1.27 million	6	
Sonia	October 24–28	Tropical storm	50 (85)	1001	None	None	None	
Season aggregates
20 systems	May 28 – October 28		145 (230)	944		>$434.5 million	44 (1)	

== See also ==
- Weather of 2025
- October 2025 Mexican floods and landslides
- Tropical cyclones in 2025
- 2025 Atlantic hurricane season
- 2025 Pacific typhoon season
- 2025 North Indian Ocean cyclone season
- South-West Indian Ocean cyclone seasons: 2024–25, 2025–26
- Australian region cyclone seasons: 2024–25, 2025–26
- South Pacific cyclone seasons: 2024–25, 2025–26
