= Cyclone Percy =

Category 5 South Pacific cyclone in 2005

Severe Tropical Cyclone Percy
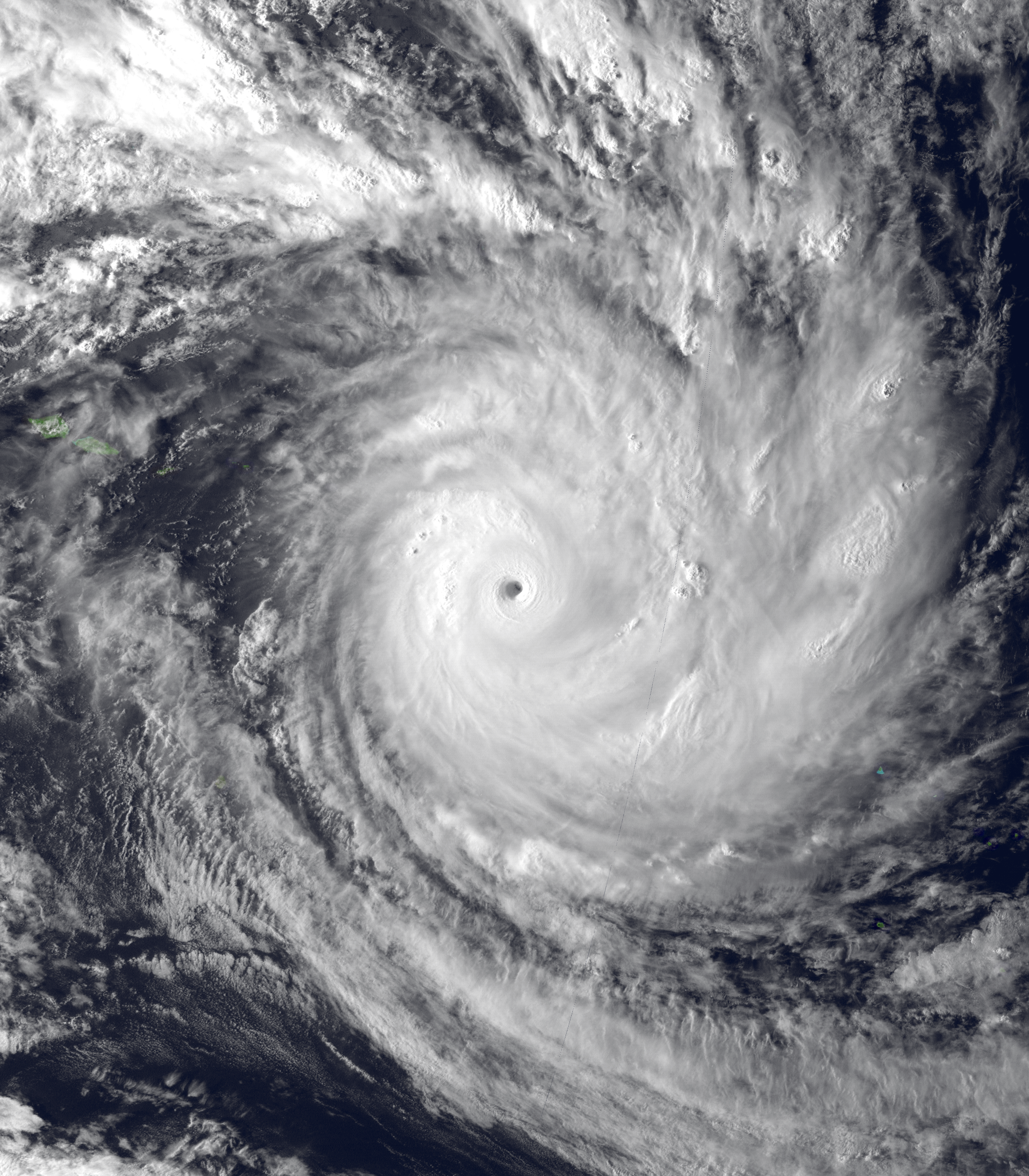
- Cyclone Percy at peak intensity on March 2

Meteorological history
- Formed: February 24, 2005
- Dissipated: March 5, 2005

Category 5 severe tropical cyclone
- 10-minute sustained (FMS)
- Highest winds: 230 km/h (145 mph)
- Lowest pressure: 900 hPa (mbar); 26.58 inHg

Category 5-equivalent tropical cyclone
- 1-minute sustained (SSHWS/JTWC)
- Highest winds: 260 km/h (160 mph)
- Lowest pressure: 898 hPa (mbar); 26.52 inHg

Overall effects
- Areas affected: American Samoa, Tokelau, Cook Islands
- IBTrACS
- Part of the 2004–05 South Pacific cyclone season

Severe Tropical Cyclone Percy was an extremely powerful tropical cyclone, which was the third and last Category 5 cyclone to form in the 2004–05 South Pacific cyclone season. The seventh named storm and the fourth and final severe tropical cyclone to form during the 2004–05 South Pacific cyclone season. Percy originated as a tropical disturbance on February 23. Over next few days, the system organized while moving east southeastward, before intensifying into a Category 1 tropical cyclone on the Australian region scale on February 26. The system quickly intensified, reaching Category 4 status later that day. On the next day, Percy was steered southward by a blocking ridge of high pressure, while stretched out the structure of the storm into an elliptical shape, weakening it back to Category 3 status. Afterward, the storm rapidly reintensified, reaching its peak intensity as a Category 5 tropical cyclone on March 2. Afterward, Percy encountered increasing wind shear and weakened once again, turning southeastward on the next day. On March 5, Percy transitioned into an extratropical storm, before dissipating soon afterward.

Percy was also the most damaging of the South Pacific February cyclones that year, as it battered the Cook Islands, which were still recovering from the impacts of Cyclones Meena, Nancy and Olaf. Percy then devastated the island of Tokelau, leaving many homeless and millions in dollars in property damages (although exact damage figures are unavailable). Because of warnings in anticipation of the storm, there were no deaths and there were only a few injuries.

== Meteorological history ==
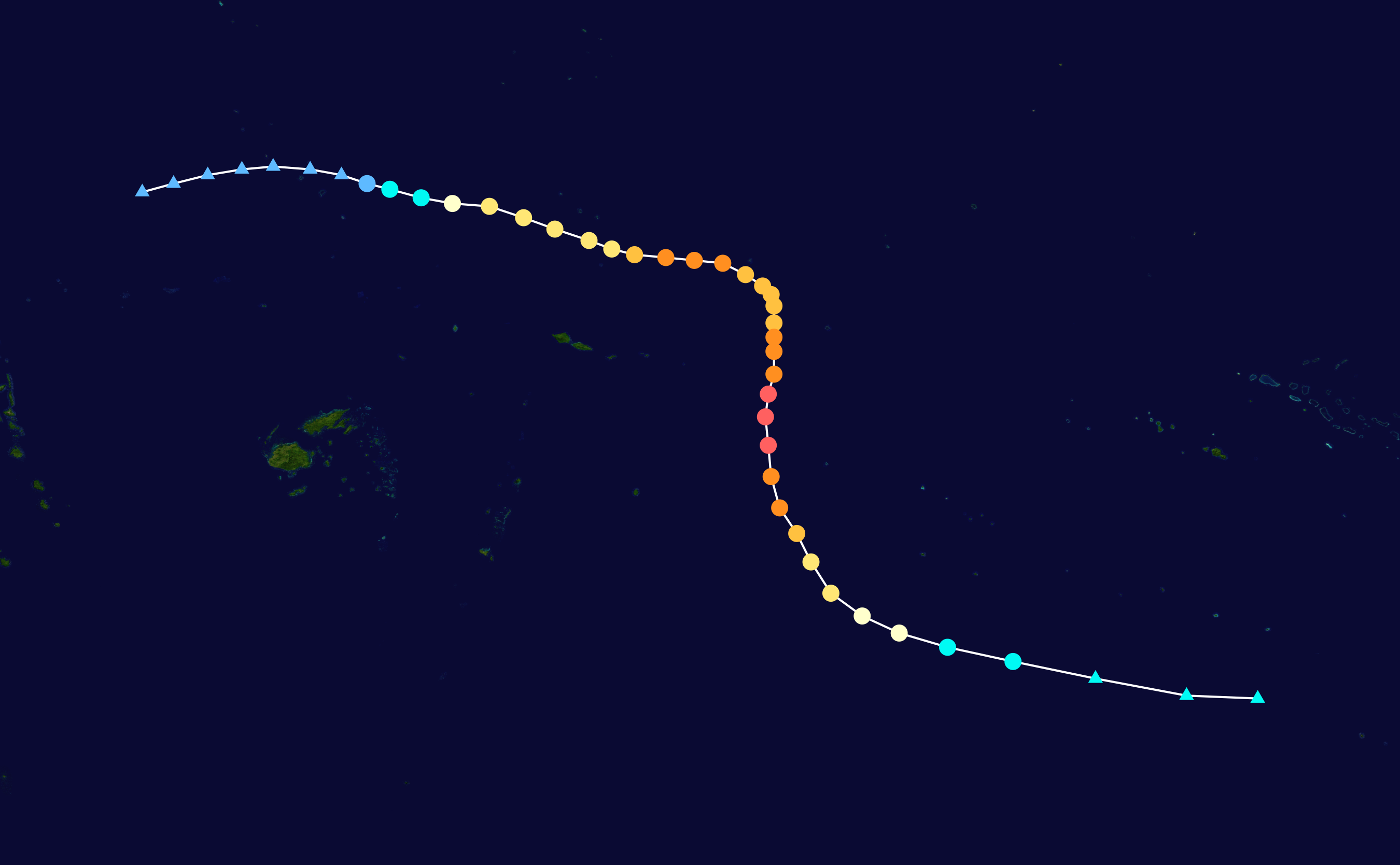
Map plotting the storm's track and intensity, according to the Saffir–Simpson scale Map key Saffir–Simpson scale Tropical depression (≤38 mph, ≤62 km/h) Tropical storm (39–73 mph, 63–118 km/h) Category 1 (74–95 mph, 119–153 km/h) Category 2 (96–110 mph, 154–177 km/h) Category 3 (111–129 mph, 178–208 km/h) Category 4 (130–156 mph, 209–251 km/h) Category 5 (≥157 mph, ≥252 km/h) Unknown Storm type Tropical cyclone Subtropical cyclone Extratropical cyclone, remnant low, tropical disturbance, or monsoon depression

During February 23, the Fiji Meteorological Service reported that Tropical Disturbance 10F, had developed within the monsoon trough about 700 kilometres (435 mi) to the west of the Tuvaluan atoll of Funafuti. The system was then located just south of a 250-hPa ridge axis, in a diffluent region. Wind shear and diurnal variations were evidently influencing development. Sea surface temperatures (SST) were around 31 °C.

Later on February 24, shear had decreased markedly. Outflow was favorable and developing in all quadrants. Overnight, the tropical depression underwent explosive development, with the deep convection increasing spatially and in organization while cooling. Spiral bands were also wrapping tightly around the low-level circulation center (LLCC). Since the depression was located in an area of low wind shear and warm water temperatures, the storm was able to quickly strengthen into Tropical Storm Percy, by 1800 UTC on February 24. At this point in time, Percy was located 120 miles (190 km) east of Fongafale, Tuvalu, and was moving towards the east-southeast at 14 knots (16 mph; 26 km/h).

On February 26, Percy reached Category 1 status, while located 400 miles (640 km) north of American Samoa. While Percy moved east-southeast, a shortwave trough developed southwest of the storm. The trough caused the cyclone to intensify even further to a Category 3 storm, as it passed between Fakaofa and Swains Island. Percy then reached its initial peak at Category 4 status north of Pago Pago, as its winds reached over 135 miles per hour (117 kn; 217 km/h) and the barometric pressure at its center fell to 925 millibars. On February 27, Cyclone Percy encountered a ridge of high pressure, which slowed its forward speed. Because of this, the cyclone's structure became elliptical, which caused the cyclone to weaken back to Category 3 status. By February 28, Percy bypassed the Pukapuka and Nassau Islands as a Category 3 tropical cyclone, as it continued to move south-southeastward.

By then, the cyclone was re-organizing as the storm was steered to the southeast. On March 2, Percy reached its peak intensity, with sustained winds reached 160 mph (140 knots (260 km/h)) on the Saffir-Simpson Hurricane Scale, and an estimated barometric pressure of 900 millibars. Cyclone Percy maintained Category 5 status for 18 hours, while located 110 mi (180 km) west of Palmerston Island. After reaching Category 5 status, Percy began to weaken, due to increasing wind shear. During its weakening phase, Cyclone Percy passed south of Tropical Depression 20S. Pulled by an upper-level trough, Percy swung to the east, passing Tropical Depression 24S in the process, before being caught up by another trough. By March 4, the center of Percy became detached from the main area of convection and Percy quickly weakened to a tropical storm. Tropical Storm Percy then quickly accelerated to 20 kt (23 mph (37 km/h)) as it became an extratropical storm. Percy briefly entered the New Zealand area of responsibility before becoming extratropical at 1200 UTC. By March 5, the remnants of Percy finally dissipated 700 miles (1,100 km) southwest of Rarotonga.

== Preparations ==
When Percy quickly reached tropical cyclone strength, forecasters began to issue watches and warnings for the American Samoa and Tokelau areas, which were impacted by earlier storms Nancy and Olaf. As Percy continued to move eastward, forecasters predicted the storm to strengthen into a Category 2 or Category 3 storm within 12–24 hours. meanwhile, forecasters issued gale warnings for Tokelau. On 26 February, forecasters predicted Percy would stay on its current track and miss the island of Atafu by 50–70 miles (80–113 km), even though the storm could bring damaging gale-force winds and heavy rains to the island. However, forecasters predicted Percy would make landfall on Tokelau. In American Samoa, hurricane warnings were issued for Swains Island, while the rest of American Samoa remained under a hurricane watch. Later, the gale warnings for Tokelau were changed to hurricane warnings as Percy moved to within 75 miles (121 km) north of Atafu. In Nukunou and Fakaofo, forecasters predicted that the cyclone would bring 60–70 mph (97–113 km/h) winds, heavy rains and possible flooding in low-lying areas.

Forecasters predicted that Cyclone Percy was going to turn to the southeast and hit the islands of Pukapuka and Nassau in the Northern Cook Islands directly. Because of this, evacuations were ordered and emergency shelters were activated in Rarotonga. Forecasters also predicted that Percy was going to cause a strong storm surge. The Joint Typhoon Warning Center and NOAA also predicted that the storm was going to strengthen further within 12–24 hours. In addition, forecast models predicted that Cyclone Percy would take a similar track like Cyclone Olaf weeks earlier. That prompted officials in the Southern Cook Islands to order evacuations.

== Impact ==
Severe Tropical Cyclone Percy impacted Tokelau, Samoa, American Samoa as well as the Northern and Southern Cook Islands, where it caused widespread damage. Like the earlier cyclones Meena, Nancy, and Olaf, Percy left widespread damage across Swains Island, Tokelau, and the northern Cook Islands. However, because of well-executed warnings, there were no deaths and there were only a few injuries. Percy was the worst cyclone to strike Tokelau since a similar cyclone hit the area in 1966.

=== Tokelau ===
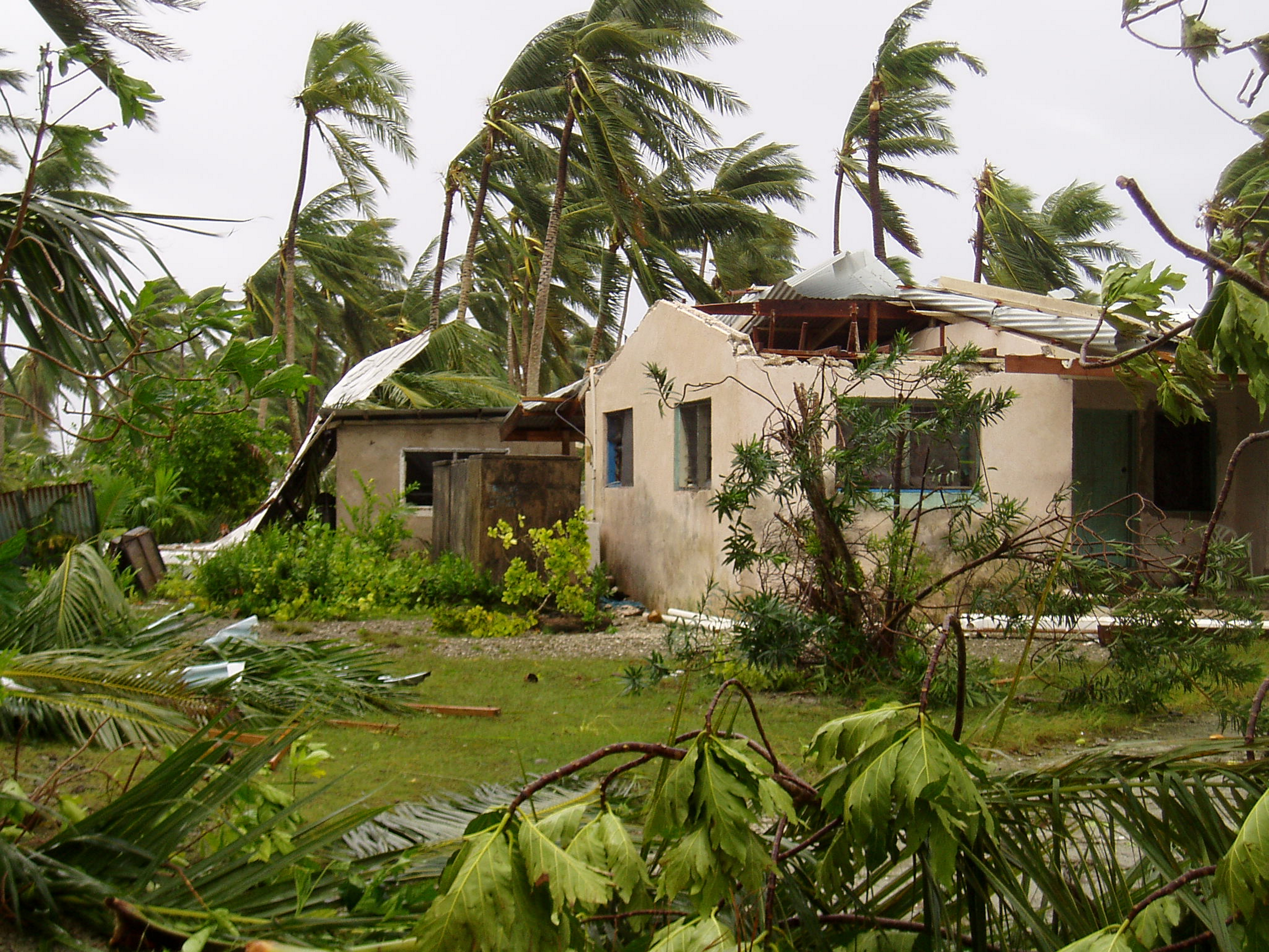
A building in Tokelau damaged by Cyclone Percy

Percy impacted Tokelau between February 25–27, where it caused widespread damage within the three atolls of Nukunonu, Fakaofo and Atafu. Ahead of the system impacting the New Zealand dependency, a gale warning was issued for the whole of Tokelau by the FMS, before this was upgraded to a storm warning later that day for the atolls of Nukunono and Fakaofo. However, these warnings were not received on the islands and the first notification of the impending cyclone came in a telephone call from New Zealand.

In Fakaofo, the storm surge from Percy damaged a sea wall and caused major beach erosion. One house was destroyed while others were severely damaged. Percy also damaged much of the coconut harvest and 50% of the livestock were killed by the cyclone. Atafu also suffered similar damage as the storm damaged a UHF tower and several storage sheds. Damage to crops was also significant as the storm damaged much of the banana and pandanus harvests. The schools in Atafu suffered only minimal damage (mostly wind damage).

=== American Samoa ===
The strong winds from Percy knocked out power and communications infrastructure in Swains Island. Efforts to re-establish contact with the island were unsuccessful for a week. After the storm, however, all eight people who rode out the storm survived, though nine of the eleven buildings on the islands were destroyed or severely damaged. Damage in American Samoa was minimal. In Tokelau, Percy damaged trees and knocked down powerlines. During the height of the storm, one person was injured by flying debris, and two others were swept out to sea, but all three survived. In Nokonunu, the cyclone destroyed the only school and damaged 80% of the structures. The local hospital completely lost power during the storm and its emergency generator was overwhelmed by the flooding.

=== Cook Islands ===
The Northern Cook Islands were hardest hit by Percy as the storm left 640 people homeless, of which 600 were in Pukapuka, and 40 were in Nassau. Of the buildings and houses destroyed or severely damaged, only ten were left standing. One person was rescued when his fishing boat stalled during the storm. Percy also damaged a solar power station, making it inoperable. Percy also battered the southern Cook Islands while weakening, although the damage there was minimal.

== Aftermath ==
Relief efforts followed after Cyclone Percy. In Swains Island, a rescue plane dropped food and supplies. In Tokelau and northern Cook Islands, the governments of Australia and New Zealand offered over $200,000 (2005 USD) in relief aid.

In Tokelau, many of the local officials feared about contamination since the cyclone had scattered human waste, trash, and other debris in the ocean and across the island. There was also an increase of mosquitoes and other insects, increasing the threat of a dengue fever outbreak. In addition, the storm damaged many of the hospitals, making treatment of the injured or displaced difficult. Criticism of government preparedness followed after Percy as emergency plans were not easily understood by the local population. In Nukunonu, the school, which was destroyed by Percy, was poorly built and vulnerable, and there was no early warning system. Also, many of the population had little time to prepare for the storm because of a social event held hours earlier.

As a result of the significant damage in Tokelau and the Cook Islands, the name Percy was retired and replaced with Pita.

== See also ==
- Cyclone Winston
- Cyclone Gita
