= Cyclone Olaf =

South Pacific cyclone in 2005

Severe Tropical Cyclone Olaf
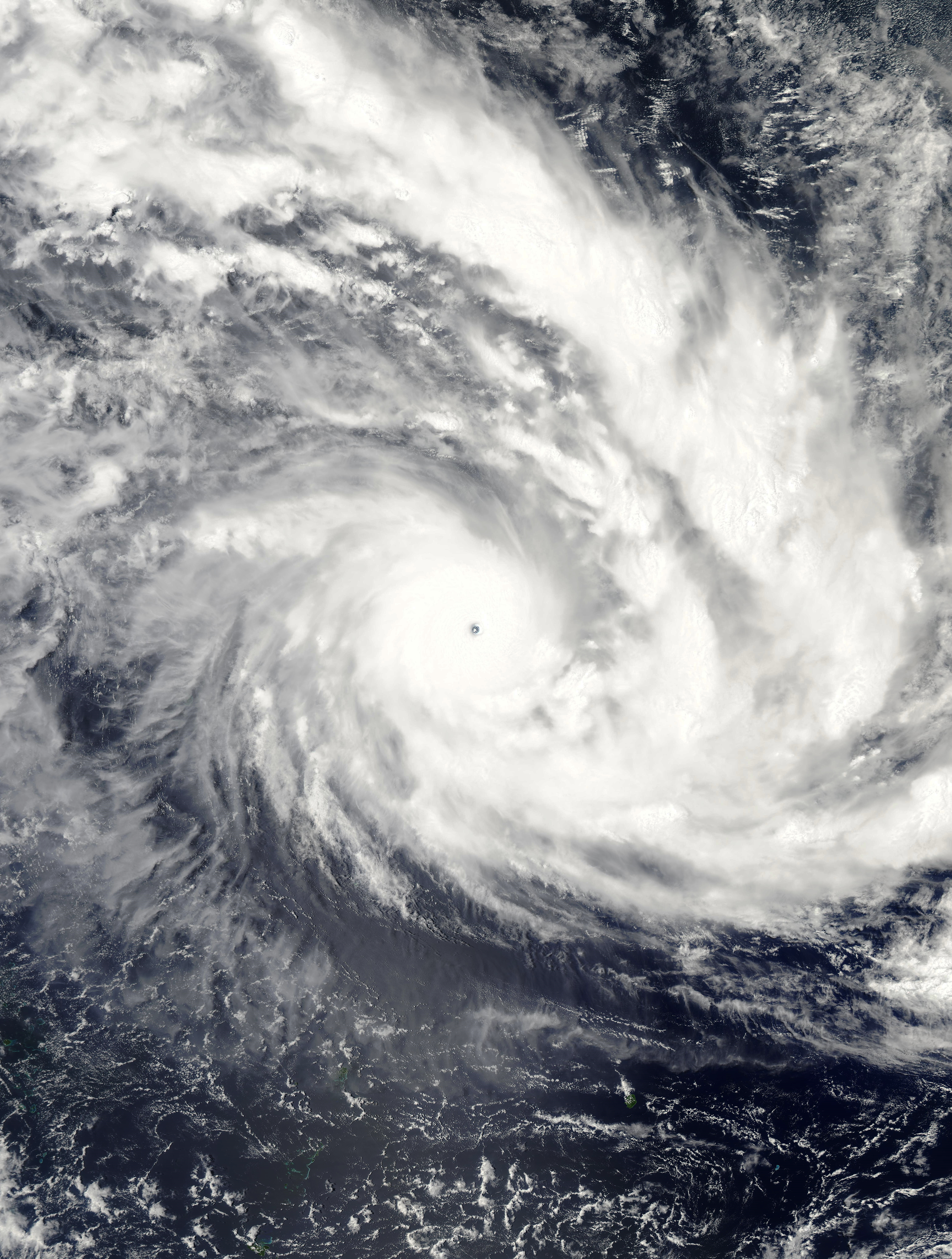
- Cyclone Olaf near peak intensity on February 16

Meteorological history
- Formed: February 10, 2005
- Extratropical: February 25, 2005
- Dissipated: February 25, 2005

Category 5 severe tropical cyclone
- 10-minute sustained (FMS)
- Highest winds: 215 km/h (130 mph)
- Lowest pressure: 915 hPa (mbar); 27.02 inHg

Category 5-equivalent tropical cyclone
- 1-minute sustained (SSHWS/JTWC)
- Highest winds: 270 km/h (165 mph)
- Lowest pressure: 892 hPa (mbar); 26.34 inHg

Overall effects
- Fatalities: None
- Missing: 2
- Damage: $10 million
- Areas affected: Samoan Islands; Cook Islands
- IBTrACS
- Part of the 2004–05 South Pacific cyclone season

Severe Tropical Cyclone Olaf was the sixth cyclone to form in the Southwest Pacific Ocean during the 2004–05 South Pacific cyclone season. Olaf was also one of three simultaneous cyclones to form during the 2004–05 season, forming 21 hours after Cyclone Nancy formed to the east. A powerful Category 5 cyclone, Olaf stuck American Samoa causing heavy damage although exact estimates are unknown. Despite the damage, there were no reported deaths or injuries from the cyclone. Olaf was third South Pacific cyclone to hit the Cook Islands during the 2004–05 season (the other two being Meena and Nancy), and Cyclone Percy would later affect the already devastated archipelago less than 2 weeks later.

== Meteorological history ==
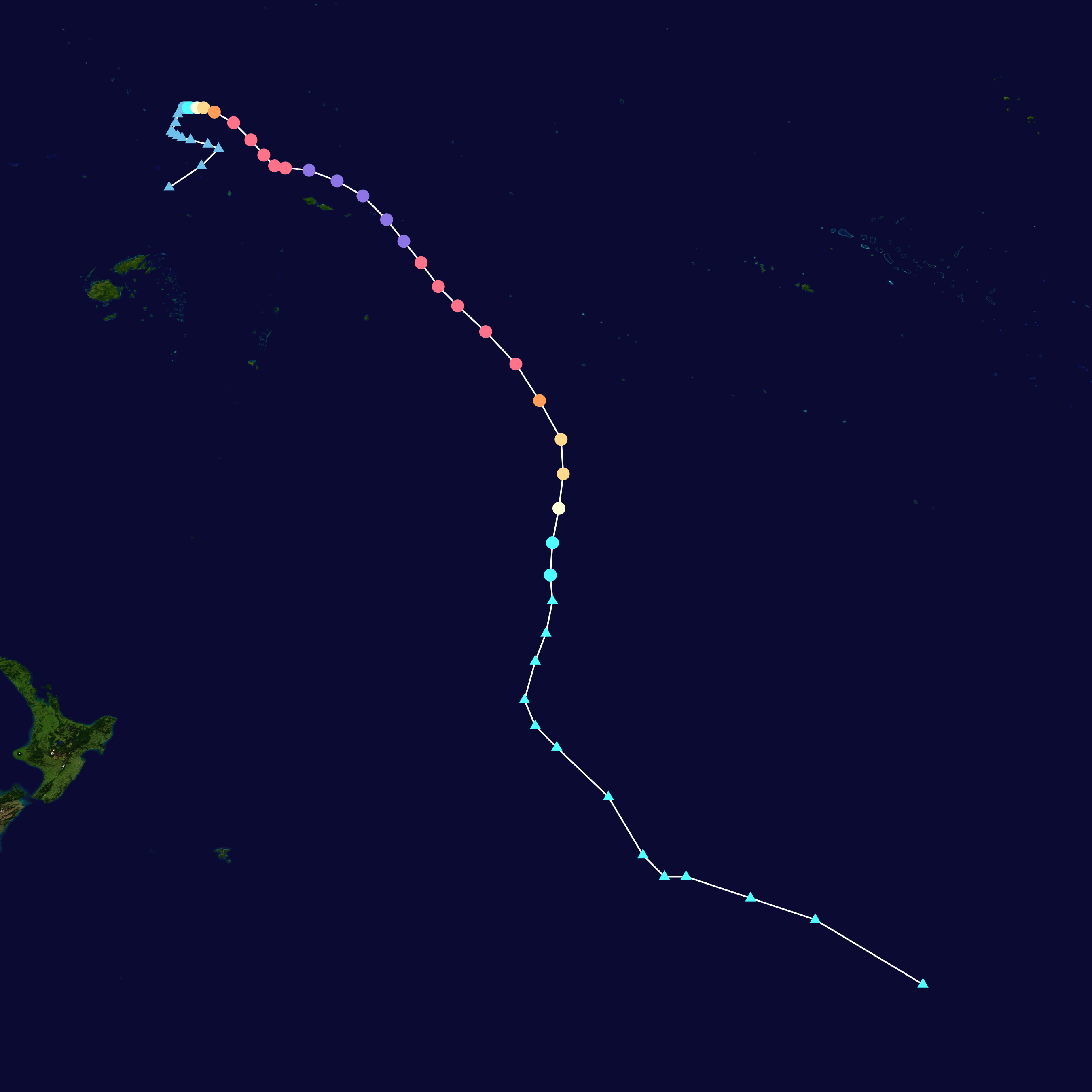
Map plotting the storm's track and intensity, according to the Saffir–Simpson scale Map key Saffir–Simpson scale Tropical depression (≤38 mph, ≤62 km/h) Tropical storm (39–73 mph, 63–118 km/h) Category 1 (74–95 mph, 119–153 km/h) Category 2 (96–110 mph, 154–177 km/h) Category 3 (111–129 mph, 178–208 km/h) Category 4 (130–156 mph, 209–251 km/h) Category 5 (≥157 mph, ≥252 km/h) Unknown Storm type Tropical cyclone Subtropical cyclone Extratropical cyclone, remnant low, tropical disturbance, or monsoon depression

Towards the middle of February 2005, a monsoonal trough of low pressure developed near the island nation of Tuvalu and extended eastwards to the north of the Samoan Islands. During February 10, this area of low pressure spawned two systems, which were classified as the eight and ninth tropical disturbances of the 2004-05 season by the Fiji Meteorological Service (FMS). The first of these tropical disturbances was classified as 09F, while it was located about 330 km (205 mi) to the northeast of Apia, Samoa and later developed into Severe Tropical Cyclone Nancy. The second of these disturbances was 08F which was classified as a tropical disturbance while it was located about 650 km (405 mi) to the northeast of Nadi, Fiji.

A tropical wave formed on February 10. The tropical wave, then spawned two areas of low pressure, one of which became Tropical Depression 08F. At 1300 UTC, the tropical depression was located 490 miles north west of Apia. By 1500, the depression organized into a tropical storm with 40 mph wind and was named Olaf. At the time of formation, the tropical storm was nearly stationary. The low wind shear and warm water temperatures allowed Olaf to undergo rapid intensification. In a 12‑hour period, Olaf quickly became a Category 1 cyclone with 80 mph (130 km/h) winds in a 10-minute average speed. On February 15, the barometric pressure fell to 930 mbar as Olaf reached Category 4 status. After reaching Category 4 status, Olaf then moved on a south-southeasterly course at 7 mph (11 km/h).

Cyclone Olaf then tuned east and moving 100 miles (160 km) east of Western Samoa. On February 16, satellite imagery depicted a well-defined eye as Olaf strengthened into a Category 5 cyclone. Olaf reached a peak intensity of 165 mph with a barometric pressure of 915 millibars. It is possible Olaf could have a lower pressure but official track reports have Olaf at 915 mbar. At the time of peak intensity, the center of the storm was only 70 miles (110 km) northeast of American Samoa and 90 miles (140 km) northwest of Pago Pago. At the same time, Cyclone Olaf underwent a minor Fujiwhara effect with Cyclone Nancy before resuming its southeasterly course. Moving at 10 mph (16 km/h), the cyclone maintained Category 5 status as the eye passed 15 miles east of Ta'u, American Samoa. During that time, a weather station reported a 931 barometric pressure reading.

On February 18, an approaching upper-level trough to the south, and strong wind shear caused Olaf to weaken as the storm rapidly moved southeastward. As Olaf moved into the New Zealand area of responsibility, the main circulation separated from the center and Olaf quickly became extratropical 18 hours later. The extratropical remnants of Olaf, quickly re-intensified into a powerful extratropical storm on February 23. The extratropical storm persisted for two days before dissipating near Pitcairn Island

== Preparations ==
Forecasts predicted Olaf to move near and over Samoa and American Samoa in 24–48 hours and hitting the southern Cook Islands as a Category 4 cyclone. In American Samoa, schools and businesses were closed and warnings were broadcasting over television and radio. Forecasters predicted that Olaf will bring storm surge and inland flooding and strong winds. In Niue, the cyclone was carefully monitored by forecasters, fearing a repeat of the destruction wrought by Cyclone Heta a year ago. French Polynesia was also under a cyclone warning. Forecasters further issued Watches and warnings for the rest of the Cook Islands.

The next day, Olaf diverted course forcing authorities to order evacuations. In Tutuila, 70 emergency shelters were opened and 1,000 people evacuated low-lying areas. The approach of the cyclone, shut down the local airport, cancelling numerous flights. In Tau, most of the residences evacuated to storm shelters built on higher ground. The evaluation in the Manu'a group islands, totaled up to 2,000.

== Impact ==
A destructive cyclone, Olaf caused severe damage in both Samoa and American Samoa. Because of well executed warnings and evacuations, there were no deaths. However, 2 people were reported missing and assumed dead, when their boat sank during the storm.

=== Samoan Islands ===
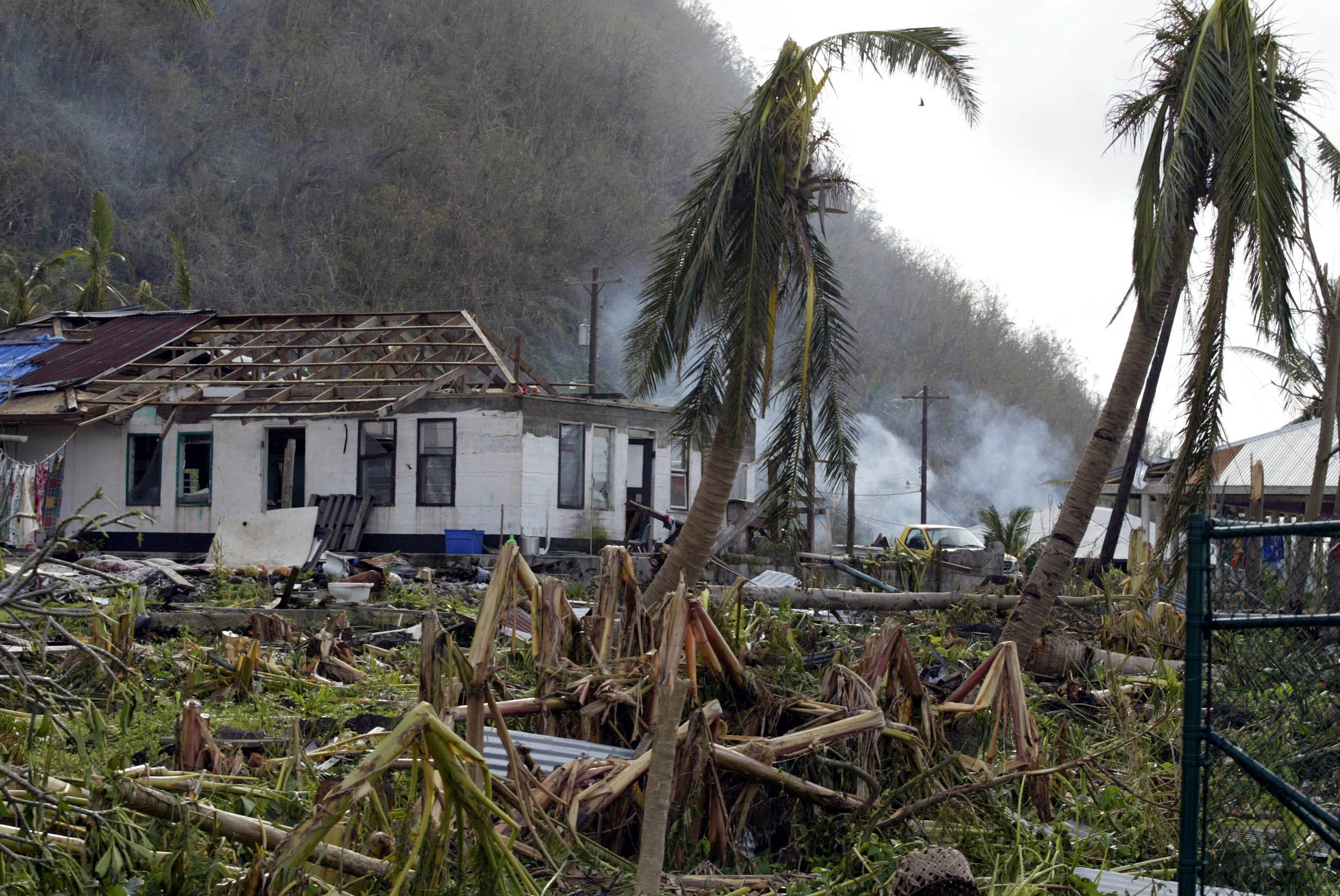
Damage to a home and the surrounding terrain in Fitiuta, American Samoa

Although the eye of Olaf never made landfall, several weather stations reported sustained winds of 75–125 mph (121–201 km/h). The winds damaged powerlines and closed an airport. Olaf also produced storm surge damage along the coast. Offshore, fishing fleet was caught off guard by the storm. One of the boats, sank 150 miles (240 km) off the coast of Samoa, however the crew was rescued. 21 other fishermen were also rescued. Olaf then brushed past the American Samoa, bringing 125 mph (201 km/h) winds. Because of Olaf strength, there was severe damage across American Samoa. In the Manua Islands, the storm destroyed several seaside homes, ruined crops and left thousands without power. In Tau, 80–90 percent of the infrastructure was destroyed by the storm. Offshore, three people were rescued after their boat sank near Pago Pago.

=== Cook Islands ===
Olaf then struck the Cook Islands which were already reeling form the impact of Cyclones Meena and Nancy earlier. In Rarotonga, Olaf skirted the western side of the island. That placed the island in the strongest part of the storm, which resulted in extensive damage to homes and businesses. According to press reports, nearly 30–40 percent of the population was left without electricity and 60% of the structures sustained damage.

== Aftermath ==
Olaf damaged several water stations in the Manua Islands causing a water shortage. Because of the damage, President George W. Bush declared those islands disaster areas. The declaration allowed residents and local governments in the American Samoa to receive federal aid. The Federal Emergency Management Agency provided much aid to the residents of the American Samoa. The Initial Response Resources were sent to the American Samoa and its surrounding islands and was distributed by the United States Coast Guard and the government of the American Samoa on February 21, 2005. Despite the devastation in the Manua Islands, it could have been worse if Olaf hit American Samoa directly. In the Cook Islands, the Australian and New Zealand governments provided over A$30,000 (2005) in relief assistance. On February 22, 2005, the Government of New Zealand, provided materials and workmen to help with the cleanup effort. The French government and the United Nations also assisted in the relief effort by sending soldiers from Tahiti and providing more aid to the stricken residents.

Because of the extensive damage in Samoa and the Cook Islands, Olaf was retired in May of 2006, and was replaced with Osai.

== See also ==
- Other storms of the same name
- List of retired South Pacific cyclone names
