= Cyclone Nancy =

South Pacific cyclone in 2005

Severe Tropical Cyclone Nancy
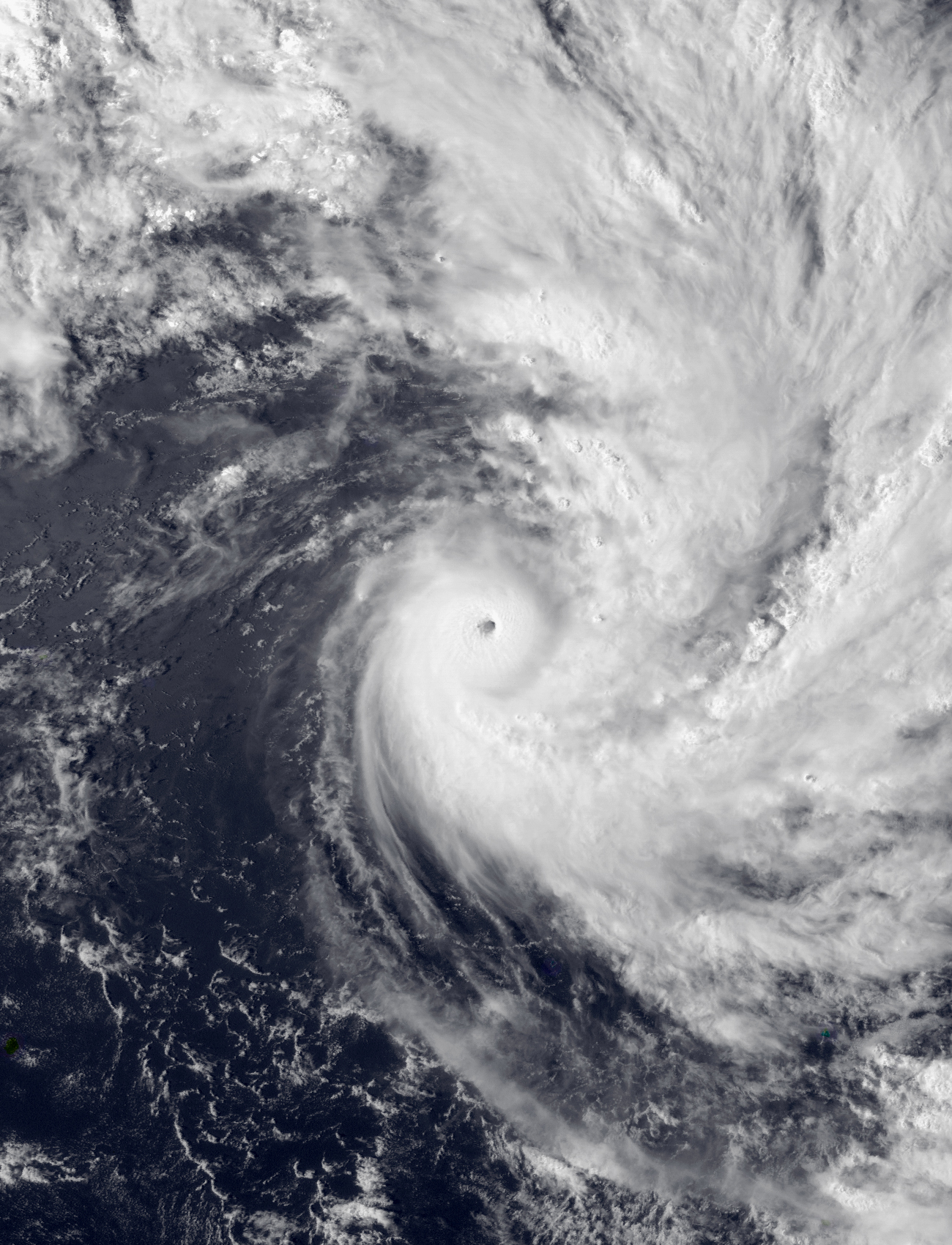
- Cyclone Nancy prior to peak intensity on February 14

Meteorological history
- Formed: February 10, 2005
- Dissipated: February 17, 2005

Category 4 severe tropical cyclone
- 10-minute sustained (FMS)
- Highest winds: 175 km/h (110 mph)
- Lowest pressure: 935 hPa (mbar); 27.61 inHg

Category 4-equivalent tropical cyclone
- 1-minute sustained (SSHWS/JTWC)
- Highest winds: 230 km/h (145 mph)
- Lowest pressure: 916 hPa (mbar); 27.05 inHg

Overall effects
- Fatalities: None
- Areas affected: Cook Islands
- IBTrACS
- Part of the 2004–05 South Pacific cyclone season

Severe Tropical Cyclone Nancy (RSMC Nadi designation: 09F, JTWC designation: 18P) was the second in a series of four severe tropical cyclones to impact the Cook Islands during February 2005. Forming out of an area of low pressure on February 10, Nancy quickly organized into a small, but intense, cyclone. By February 14, the storm explosively intensified into a Category 4 severe tropical cyclone with winds peaking at 175 km/h (109 mph) 10-minute winds) (Note: The maximum sustained wind reported by the Regional Specialized Meteorological Center in Nadi, Fiji are measured by 10-minute standards) and a minimum barometric pressure of 935 hPa (mbar). Over the following day, increasing wind shear rapidly weakened the cyclone and by February 17, it transitioned into an extratropical cyclone shortly before being absorbed by Cyclone Olaf.

Already impacted by Cyclone Meena in early February, the Cook Islands sustained significant damage from Cyclone Nancy. Several homes were damaged and destroyed throughout the islands. Downed trees and power lines blocked roads and cut power and minor flooding was reported along coastal areas. Following the impact of the storm, the World Meteorological Organization retired the name Nancy in May 2006 and replaced it with the name Nat.

== Meteorological history ==
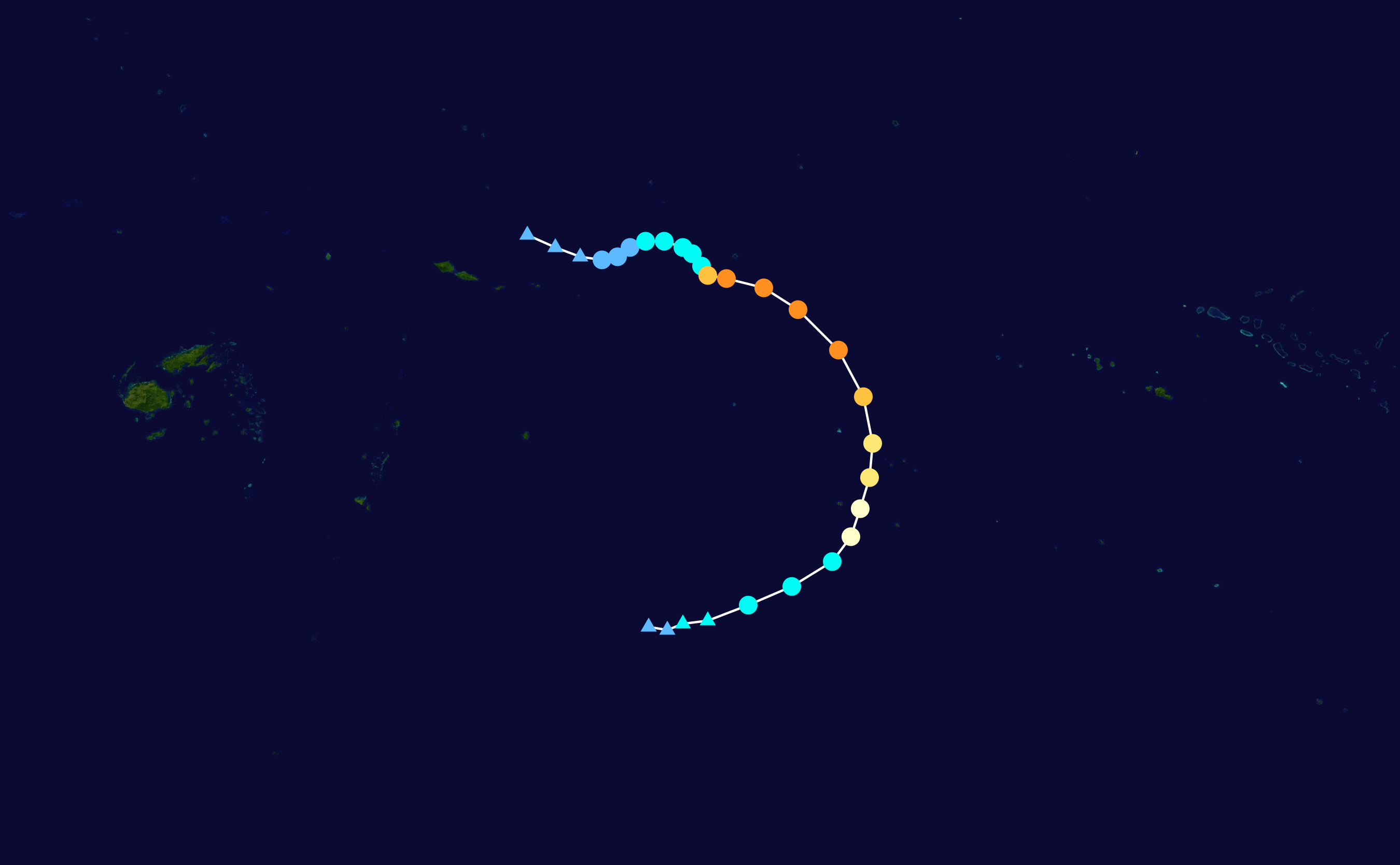
Map plotting the storm's track and intensity, according to the Saffir–Simpson scale Map key Saffir–Simpson scale Tropical depression (≤38 mph, ≤62 km/h) Tropical storm (39–73 mph, 63–118 km/h) Category 1 (74–95 mph, 119–153 km/h) Category 2 (96–110 mph, 154–177 km/h) Category 3 (111–129 mph, 178–208 km/h) Category 4 (130–156 mph, 209–251 km/h) Category 5 (≥157 mph, ≥252 km/h) Unknown Storm type Tropical cyclone Subtropical cyclone Extratropical cyclone, remnant low, tropical disturbance, or monsoon depression

Cyclone Nancy originated out of a broad area of low pressure within a monsoonal trough northeast of Samoa on February 10. Initially, the system was nearly stationary within an area of weak steering currents, low wind shear and high sea surface temperatures, exceeding 30 °C (86 °F). On February 11, a trough briefly increased shear over the system and its nearby twin, the precursor to Cyclone Olaf. By 0600 UTC on February 12, the system's outflow improved and a small area of deep convection, known as the central dense overcast, developed over the center of circulation. Later that day, the Regional Specialized Meteorological Centre (RSMC) in Nadi, Fiji upgraded the system to a Category 1 cyclone and gave it the name Nancy while it was located about 485 km (301 mi) east-northeast of Pago Pago, American Samoa. By this time, the Joint Typhoon Warning Center (JTWC) had also begun issuing advisories on the storm, designating it as Tropical Cyclone 18P.

The storm had undertaken a slow northeast motion early on February 13 before turning southeast in response to a mid-level ridge located northeast of the cyclone. Convective banding features developed close to the center of circulation as the storm began to undergo explosive intensification. Around 1200 UTC, the storm attained Severe Tropical Cyclone status as winds reached 120 km/h (75 mph) 10-minute winds) and a small, irregularly shaped, eye began to develop. The JTWC, however, assessed Nancy to have been substantially weaker until 0000 UTC on February 14, at which time they reported a 95 km/h (59 mph) increase in winds, attaining minimal Category 3 status on the Saffir–Simpson hurricane scale.

By 1200 UTC on February 14, Nancy attained its peak intensity with winds of 175 km/h (109 mph) 10-minute winds) and a barometric pressure of 935 hPa (mbar). Shortly after, the JTWC assessed Nancy to have peaked with winds of 230 km/h (140 mph) 1-minute winds). Increasing forward motion to the southeast and increasing wind shear caused Nancy to weaken. Early on February 15, the storm passed directly over Manuae. Continued weakening took place as a trough approached from the southwest. By February 16, Nancy weakened below hurricane intensity and turned to the southwest as it began to undergo a Fujiwhara interaction with Cyclone Olaf to the north.

Strong shear associated with the outflow of Cyclone Olaf caused all convection associated with Nancy to be displaced to the southwest on February 16. Early on February 17, Nancy transitioned into an extratropical cyclone as it entered the area of responsibility of the Tropical cyclone warning centre (TCWC) in Wellington, New Zealand. Shortly after, the low was absorbed into the larger circulation of Olaf. However, TCWC Wellington continued to monitor Nancy as a separate system until 1200 UTC on February 18.

=== Differences among warning centers ===
The Regional Specialized Meteorological Center in Nadi, Fiji uses 10-minute sustained winds for its tropical cyclone tracking information, while the Joint Typhoon Warning Center uses 1-minute sustained winds. The conversion factor between the two is 1.14. RSMC Nadi's peak intensity for Nancy was 175 km/h (109 mph) 10-minute sustained, or 205 km/h (127 mph) 1-minute sustained. The JTWC's peak intensity for Nancy was 230 km/h (140 mph) 1-minute sustained, or 205 km/h (127 mph) 10-minute sustained.

== Preparations ==
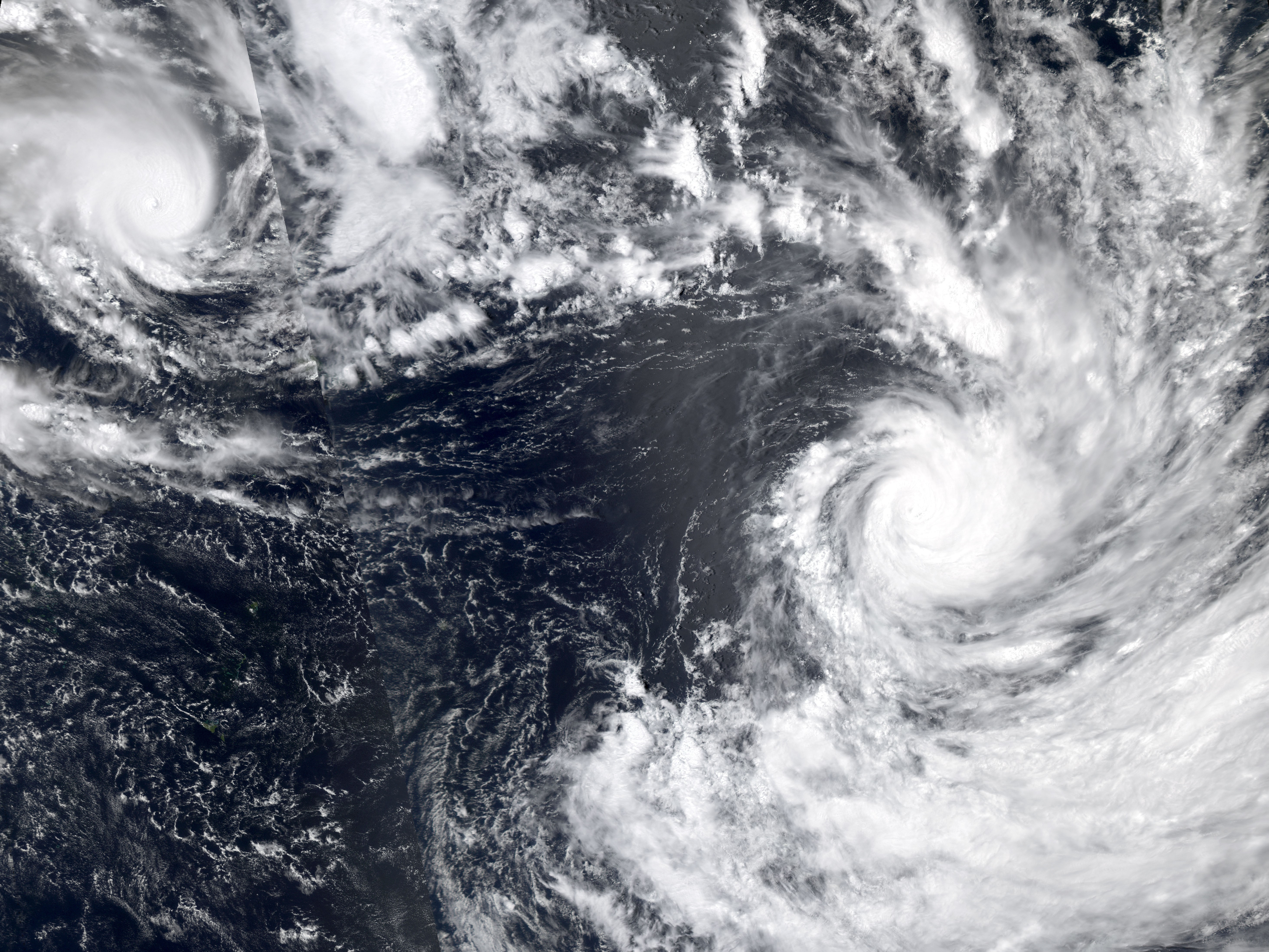
Cyclones Nancy (right) and Olaf (left) on February 14

Upon being named Nancy on February 13, a gale warning was put in place for American Samoa. Later that day, four additional countries were placed under watches and warnings. A gale watch was declared for Samoa and strong wind warnings were raised in Tuvalu, Tokelau and the Cook Islands. On February 14, a tropical cyclone alert was declared for the southern Cook Islands. Additionally, Niue was placed under a strong wind warning. Later that day, Wallis and Futuna were placed under a strong wind warning. On February 15, a hurricane warning was issued for the southern Cook Islands as Nancy tracked through the archipelago.

Already impacted by Cyclone Meena just a week prior, residents in the Cook Islands heeded warnings and evacuated to emergency shelters. Coastal areas where seawalls had been damaged or destroyed by Meena were of particular interest to warning centers and urged all people in the vicinity of them to evacuate to a nearby shelter. On Aitutaki, all preparations were completed by February 15. Tourists were relocated from hotels to one of six shelters set up throughout the island. An estimated 100 people reportedly evacuated to shelters out of the 2,000 that live on the island. Radio broadcasts urging people to move to shelters were broadcast all day and the local cyclone center had all staff on standby. Eight shelters were opened on Rarotonga by this time. All residents were evacuated from low-lying areas as large swells were anticipated to inundate those areas. Schools throughout the Cook Islands were closed prior to the cyclone and would remain closed for several more days. Many of the south Pacific islands were in a "critically dangerous situation" due to the quick succession of cyclones.

== Impact and aftermath ==
Cyclones Nancy (bottom) and Olaf (top) on February 16

Cyclone Nancy caused substantial damage throughout the Cook Islands. On Atiu, all communication to the island was cut as power lines were downed throughout the island. Winds on the island gusted up to 241 km/h (150 mph). Four homes were destroyed on the island and at least 80 trees were downed, blocking all roads. Several homes had their roofs blown off, coconut trees were downed, road were covered in debris and heavy rains fell throughout all the islands. Numerous trees were downed across Manuae and Mauke by the storm's high winds. Four homes were destroyed on Mauke. Three homes were destroyed on Mitiaro and trees blocked all roads on the island.

On Rarotonga, several bridges were damaged by high waves produced by the cyclone. Schools, churches, and restaurants were damaged by wind gusts up to 150 km/h (93 mph) throughout the island. Fifteen temporarily shelters constructed after Cyclone Meena were also destroyed. Damages caused by the storm to the Avana Marina Condominiums forced the owners to close them until mid-April to allow for reconstruction and renovation. The highest winds were recorded in the southern portions of the island chain, with a wind gust of 259 km/h (161 mph) being recorded on Mangaia. Up to 100% of the seasonal crop harvest was lost due to Cyclone Nancy.

In the wake of all four cyclones, the Cook Islands requested international assistance. Funding to repair damages from the storms reached $7.87 million. The Red Cross provided relief items, such as blankets and lanterns worth $35,200; the Pacific Forum provided food, fuel, and logistical support worth $32,000; the Government of China donated $19,200 in post-disaster funds; $32,000 in funding was provided by the United Nations Development Programme; contributions from the Australian Agency for International Development and the New Zealand Agency for International Development amounted to $862,570, consisting of fuel, shelter, relief items, and disaster funds; the Government of Australia provided $128,000 wort of fuel and equipment; lastly, the Government of France deployed military teams with recovery supplies and tents. The European Union also supplied £200,000 ($280,000) in relief funds.

Since Nancy caused substantial damage throughout the Cook Islands, the name was retired from "Naming List A" for the South Pacific basin and was replaced with Nat. The three other cyclones that impacted the region, Meena, Olaf and Percy, were also retired and replaced by Mal, Osai and Pita respectively.

== See also ==
- 2004–05 South Pacific cyclone season
