= Hurricane Erick =

Category 4 Pacific hurricane in 2025

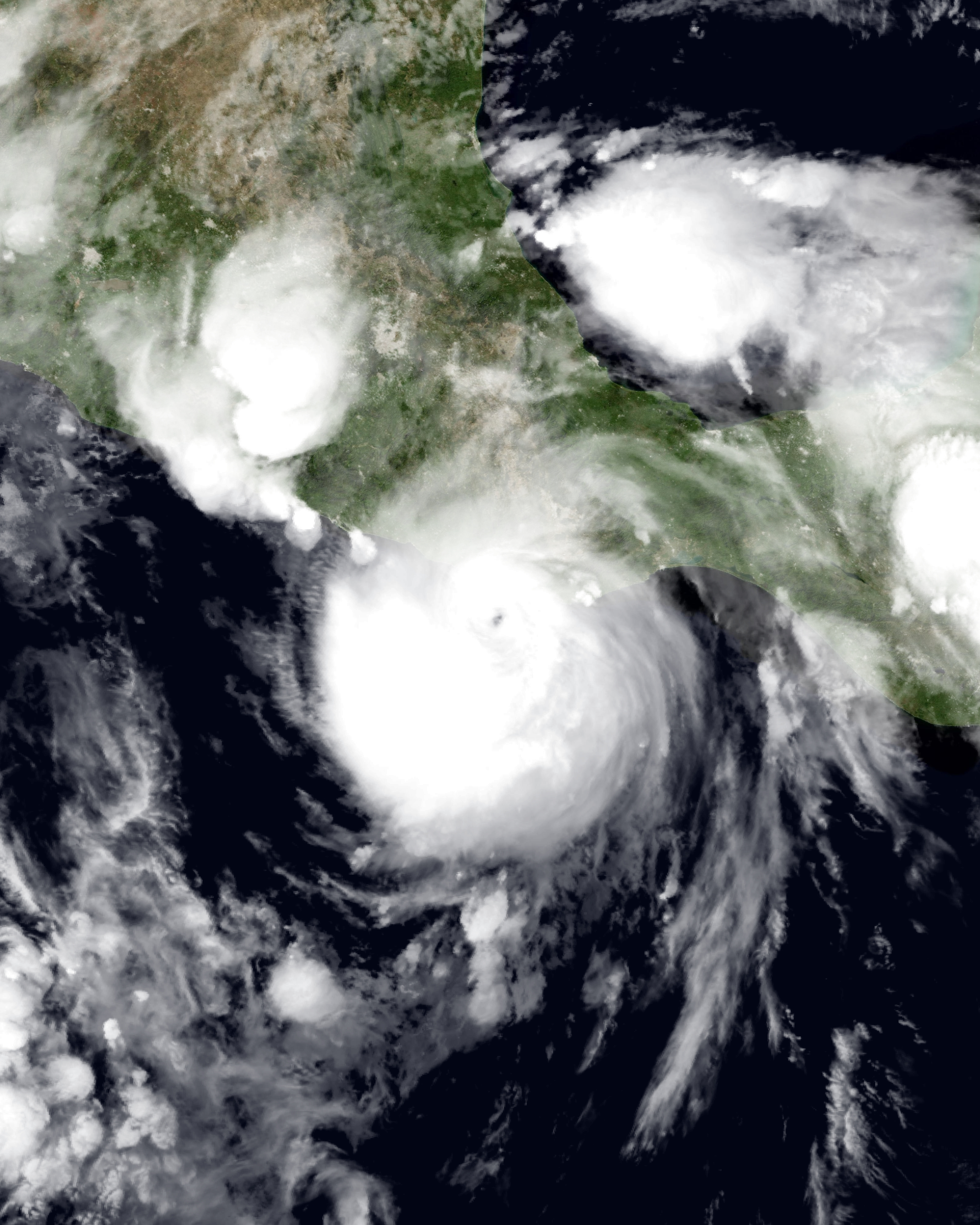
- Erick at peak intensity nearing landfall in Oaxaca early on June 19

Meteorological history
- Formed: June 17, 2025
- Dissipated: June 20, 2025

Category 4 major hurricane
- 1-minute sustained (SSHWS/NWS)
- Highest winds: 140 mph (220 km/h)
- Lowest pressure: 944 mbar (hPa); 27.88 inHg

Overall effects
- Fatalities: 24
- Injuries: 28
- Missing: 1
- Damage: $350 million (2025 USD)
- Areas affected: Central America, Southern Mexico
- IBTrACS
- Part of the 2025 Pacific hurricane season

Hurricane Erick was a powerful tropical cyclone that brought heavy rainfall to parts of southern and southwestern Mexico in June 2025. The fifth named storm, second hurricane, and first major hurricane (Note: A major hurricane is a hurricane that reaches Category 3 status or higher on the Saffir–Simpson scale) of the 2025 Pacific hurricane season, Erick was the earliest fifth named storm on record in the Eastern Pacific basin and the earliest major hurricane to make landfall on either coast of Mexico (Pacific or Atlantic).

Erick originated from a weather disturbance associated with a tropical wave located south of Mexico on June 10. The system developed into a tropical storm on June 17. As it moved northwestward, it entered a phase of rapid intensification. By early June 18, Erick had intensified into a hurricane and continued strengthening, reaching its peak as a Category 4 hurricane with sustained winds of 140 mph (230 km/h) and a minimum central pressure of 944 mb (27.88 inHg). Erick made landfall in Oaxaca on the morning of June 19 with Category 3 sustained winds of 125 mph (200 km/h). Once inland, the hurricane rapidly weakened into a tropical storm. The complete collapse of convection on June 20 caused Erick to dissipate over the interior regions of Jalisco and Nayarit.

In anticipation of Erick, the government of Mexico issued hurricane warnings for parts of the coastal areas of Oaxaca and Guerrero, along with hurricane watches and tropical storm warnings. When the storm made landfall, it knocked out electricity and cellphone coverage for at least 30,000 people in Puerto Escondido. Erick brought heavy rain across Central America and Mexico, causing flash floods and mudslides that left at least 24 dead, 28 injured, and 1 missing. The total damage was estimated at US$350 million.

== Meteorological history ==
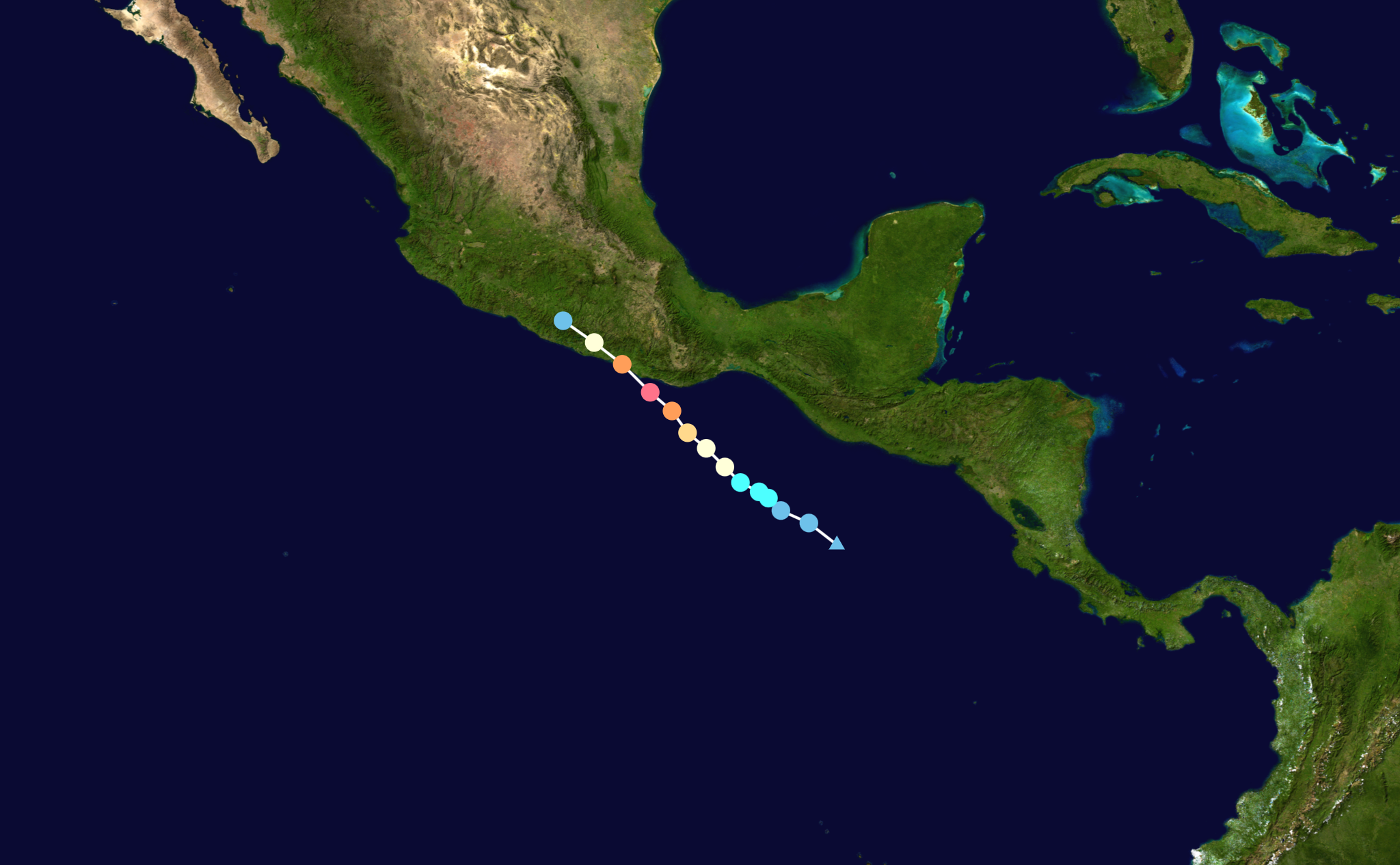
Map plotting the storm's track and intensity, according to the Saffir–Simpson scale Map key Saffir–Simpson scale Tropical depression (≤38 mph, ≤62 km/h) Tropical storm (39–73 mph, 63–118 km/h) Category 1 (74–95 mph, 119–153 km/h) Category 2 (96–110 mph, 154–177 km/h) Category 3 (111–129 mph, 178–208 km/h) Category 4 (130–156 mph, 209–251 km/h) Category 5 (≥157 mph, ≥252 km/h) Unknown Storm type Tropical cyclone Subtropical cyclone Extratropical cyclone, remnant low, tropical disturbance, or monsoon depression

On June 14, a slow-moving tropical wave emerged off the west coast of Central America. After entering the Eastern Pacific basin, a broad area of low pressure began to develop west of Costa Rica. Showers and thunderstorms associated with the low became better organized over the next couple of days, as the disturbance moved westward over very warm 85 °F (29 °C) waters, and within a moist, low wind shear environment. At 21:00 UTC on June 16, the National Hurricane Center (NHC) designated it as Potential Tropical Cyclone Five‑E due to its imminent threat to southern Mexico, and began issuing advisories. The system soon acquired a well-defined circulation, developing into Tropical Depression Five‑E by 00:00 UTC on June 17.

Amid an environment conducive to strengthening, the system strengthened into a tropical storm by 12:00 UTC on June 17, and was named Erick. Erick moved west-northwestward along the southwestern periphery of a weakening mid-level ridge situated over Mexico. Deep convection expanded, and cloud tops cooled to about −120 °F (−85 °C) near the developing inner-core structure. Later that day, Erick began to rapidly intensify. By 06:00 UTC on June 18, it became a Category 1 hurricane, while located about 215 mi (345 km) south of Salina Cruz, Oaxaca. The hurricane moved into a region of more favorable conditions, with warmer sea surface temperatures and weaker vertical wind shear.

Rapid intensification continued, and based on data collected by an Air Force Reserve Unit Hurricane Hunter, the NHC upgraded Erick to Category 2 strength by 18:00 UTC on June 18. Satellite imagery showed a more circular eye surrounded by cold cloud tops. Following another Hurricane Hunter mission, the storm was upgraded to a Category 3 major hurricane shortly after 18:00 UTC on June 18. Late that same day, satellite imagery showed deep convection wrapping around the eye. Erick developed a concentric eyewall structure, indicative of an eyewall replacement cycle. After the cycle was complete, the system intensified further, reaching its peak intensity at 06:00 UTC that day, with Category 4 maximum sustained winds of 140 mph (220 km/h), an increase of 65 mph (100 km/h) in a 24-hour period, and a minimum central pressure of 944 mb (27.88 inHg) about 70 mi (110 km) west-southwest of Puerto Ángel.Then, after weakening slightly, with clouds covering the hurricane's eye due to land interaction, Erick made landfall near 11:30 UTC on June 19, in Santo Domingo Armenta municipality, in extreme western Oaxaca, with sustained winds of 125 mph (205 km/h). Inland, the hurricane rapidly weakened as its inner core began to collapse. Moving northwestward over rugged terrain, the inner core continued to deteriorate, and the system's overall convective pattern became quite ragged. Erick weakened into a tropical depression by 00:00 UTC on June 20, and its circulation dissipated soon afterward.

=== Records ===
Erick is the earliest fifth named storm in the Eastern Pacific basin on record, surpassing the June 25 mark set by Hurricane Enrique in 2021. Erick also became the earliest major hurricane on record to make landfall on either coast of Mexico (Pacific or Atlantic), breaking the previous Pacific coast record set by Hurricane Kiko on August 26, 1989.

== Preparations ==
GOES-19 imagery of Erick making landfall in western Oaxaca on June 19

On June 17, the government of Mexico issued hurricane warnings for parts of the coastal areas of Oaxaca and Guerrero, along with hurricane watches and tropical storm warnings. Across the region, more than 2,000 shelters were opened for Erick. Over 18,000 first responders were deployed across Guerrero and Oaxaca.

As the storm rapidly intensified, residents were urged to stock up on food, water, and gasoline. Classes for all grades in forty-three municipalities were cancelled on June 18 and 19. Some classes in the lowlands of Chiapas were suspended for Erick. Beaches in Acapulco were closed, and Acapulco's port administration ordered that no one remain in their boats during the storm. Police patrolled the beaches to warn of Erick. Authorities recommended residents to go to shelters. All flights out of Acapulco International Airport were cancelled for June 19. Flights were cancelled to Bahías de Huatulco International Airport. Emergency warnings were issued from Puerto Ángel to Acapulco, with authorities advising tourists to reconsider their plans. The Mexican Navy mobilized 6,418 personnel to manage evacuations in Oaxaca. The Navy also activated a preventive plan for Colima, Tabasco, and Campeche.

== Impact ==
=== Mexico ===
Infographic of Hurricane Erick on June 18

When Hurricane Erick struck southern Mexico, it produced a variety of impacts. In Puerto Ángel, a peak storm surge of 1.05 ft (32 cm) were recorded. Additional gauges farther east measured slightly lower values, with peak surges of 0.66 ft (20 cm) at Huatulco and 0.72 ft (22 cm) at Salina Cruz. To the west, the tide gauge at Acapulco recorded a peak storm surge of 0.33 ft (10 cm). Heavy rainfall associated with Hurricane Erick caused widespread flooding and landslides in Oaxaca and Guerrero, with some areas receiving in excess of 10 inches (250 mm) of rain. The peak storm total rainfall during Erick occurred in Presidente Benito Juarez, Oaxaca, where 14.13 inches (359 mm) of rainfall was recorded. El Marques, also in Oaxaca, recorded a storm total rainfall amount of 14.05 inches (356.9 mm). The highest measured wind gust in Mexico associated with Erick was 60 mph (95 km/h) at Puerto Ángel.

Waves along Mexico's Pacific coast were 10 metres (33 ft) high. In Oaxaca, Erick produced mudslides that injured one person. The mudslides damaged several homes and schools, and closed highways. Around 200 residents were evacuated due to flooding in Pinotepa Nacional. Street flooding stalled vehicles in Salina Cruz. At least 30,000 people in Puerto Escondido were left without electricity or cellphone coverage when Erick made landfall. In Juchitán de Zaragoza, river flooding affected thousands of homes. Losses in Oaxaca reached Mex$2 billion (US$119 million).

In Guerrero, approximately 50 houses were damaged in Punta Maldonado. High winds damaged homes and businesses in communities near Laguna de Corralero. In Ometepec, roofs were detached from homes and a building toppled onto a vehicle. Several communities in the municipality of Ometepec were isolated by landslides. The Universidad Autónoma de Guerrero reported damages exceeding $1.6 million. In Acapulco, trees and powerlines were downed. Telephone service and all electricity were knocked out for most residents. Erick's rainfall caused flooding and damage along highways and dirt roads. A tunnel along the Mitla-Tehuantepec highway collapsed due to heavy rains. The Las Nutrias and Los Perros Rivers overflowed, affecting thousands of houses in Juchitán de Zaragoza. A child drowned in San Marcos, Guerrero, while a man was electrocuted in San Pedro Pochutla, Oaxaca, during debris removal following Erick's landfall. Over 90 dogs lost during Erick in Puerto Escondido were brought into a shelter. Total losses in Guerrero reached Mex$2.086 billion (US$113.6 million). Losses in Acapulco reached Mex$2.052 billion (US$112 million) while losses in the Costa Chica region totaled to Mex$29 million (US$1.6 million). In Oaxaca and Guerrero, Erick damaged or destroyed 42,552 homes, 468 schools, 1,035 mi (1,666 km) of federal highways, 772 mi (1,242 km) of state roads, 8 bridges, and 1 tunnel. In total, 276,885 customers lost power.

Remnant moisture from Erick generated heavy rains over several Mexican states. In Michoacán and Veracruz, many roadways were flooded, damaging numerous vehicles. In Tamaulipas, crocodiles were sighted due to the rains. Commercial losses in the state are estimated at Mex$60 million (US$3.22 million). In San Luis Potosí, 87 homes were flooded. A man drowned after falling into the Tampaón River while another man was killed after being swept into a storm drain while riding a horse.

=== Elsewhere ===
Heavy rains caused flooding, landslides and rockfalls across Honduras, killing two people in Santa Bárbara. Eight departments were affected by flooding, which left several people missing. A total of 5,500 people and 1,800 families were affected. 100 homes were damaged, with 26 of them being destroyed. The Ulúa River overflowed, forcing the evacuation of at least 70 families in Yoro. In Guatemala, it caused heavy rainfall in the country, which resulted in 18 deaths, one missing and 27 injuries, with 5,053 people affected and 1,017 others displaced. In El Salvador, crop damage were reported in El Paisnal due to the storm.

== Aftermath ==
The government of Mexico allocated Mex$19.5 billion (US$1.07 billion) to address the damage caused by the storm. The disaster relief organization All Hands and Hearts supported more than 2,500 people in 16 communities with clean water, tarps to repair damaged roofs, and other essential supplies, and helped rebuild the La Noria water distribution center, which provides safe drinking water to more than 150 families and neighboring communities. Profits of Mex$71 million (US$1.72 million) from the Guelaguetza festival, including the National Mezcal Fair, were devoted to the reconstruction of regions destroyed by Hurricane Erick. The Oaxaca Desarrollo Integral de la Familia System delivered mats, tarps, blankets, cleaning kits and fresh products in 166 communities. 400,000 tents, 4,200 US gal (16,000 L) of water and 2,500 tarpaulins have also been distributed. In Oaxaca, cleaning and removal of landslides were carried out on at least 194 mi (312 km) kilometers of roads, as well as the dismantling of structures at risk of collapse. The Mexican Navy restored basic services for the population of Oaxaca, and cleaned streets and roads, and removed debris and garbage in sewers. The International Fund for Animal Welfare treated more than 150 animals and distributed more than one tonne of animal food in Oaxaca. In Guerrero, 63 bridges and 43 road sections were restored. An investment of Mex$1800 million (US$99 million) were used to restore connectivity in damaged communities. More than 600 thousand cubic feet of debris and materials dragged by the water have been removed.

== See also ==
- List of Category 4 Pacific hurricanes
- List of Mexico hurricanes

- Hurricane Bridget (1971) – a Category 2 hurricane that struck Acapulco
- Hurricane Pauline (1997) – a Category 4 hurricane that heavily impacted Acapulco and resulted in over 300 deaths
- Hurricane Carlotta (2012) – a Category 2 hurricane that made landfall near Puerto Escondido, Oaxaca
- Hurricane Agatha (2022) – a Category 2 hurricane that made landfall near Puerto Ángel, Oaxaca
- Hurricane Otis (2023) – a Category 5 hurricane that explosively intensified before making landfall near Acapulco
- Hurricane John (2024) – a Category 3 hurricane that rapidly intensified before making landfall twice in Guerrero

- Timeline of the 2025 Pacific hurricane season
- Tropical cyclones in 2025
- Weather of 2025
