= Timeline of the 2025 Pacific hurricane season =

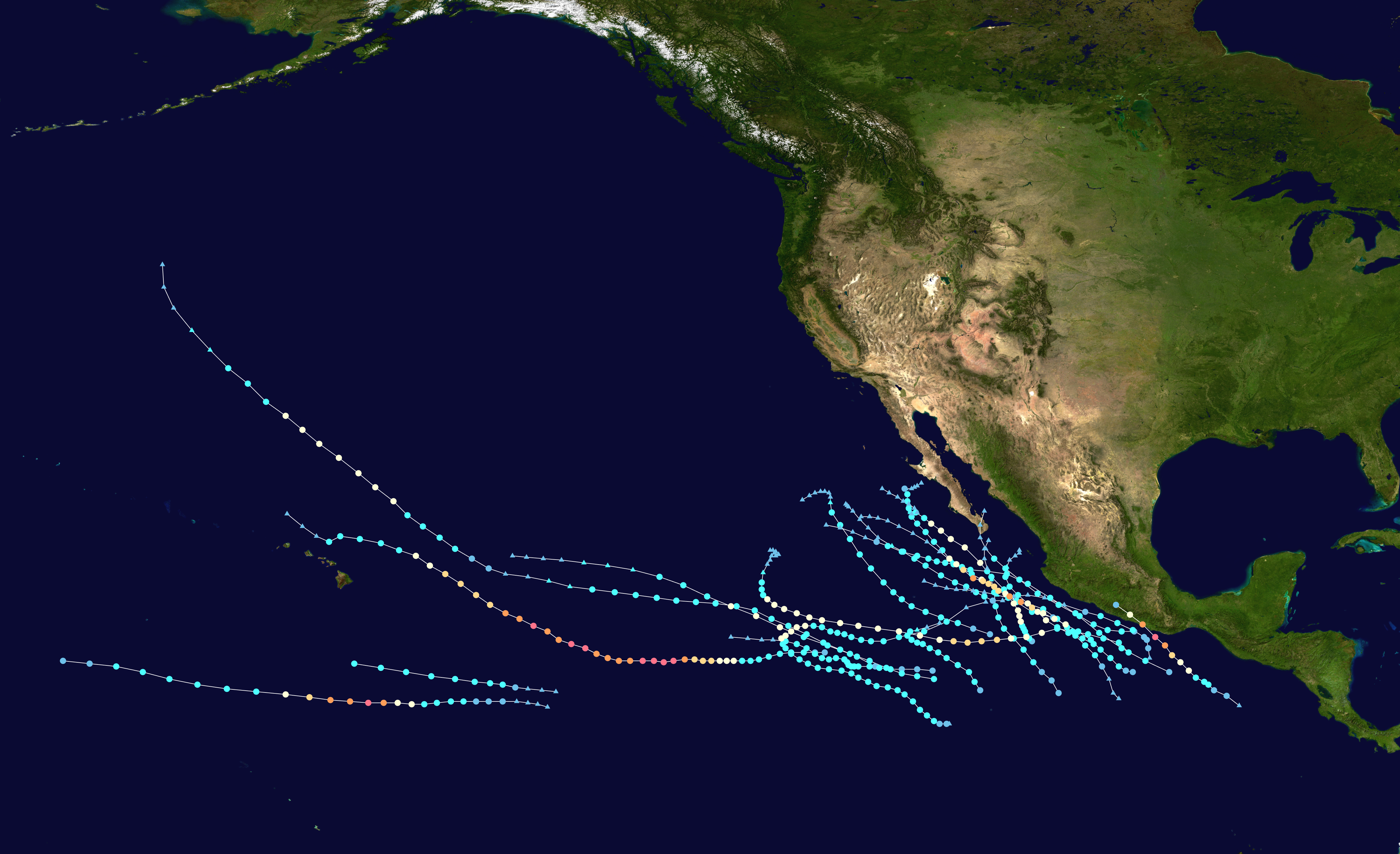
- Season summary map

Season boundaries
- First system formed: May 28, 2025
- Last system dissipated: October 28, 2025

Strongest system
- By maximum sustained winds: Kiko
  - Maximum winds: 145 mph (230 km/h)
  - Lowest pressure: 945 mbar (hPa; 27.91 inHg)
- By central pressure: Erick
  - Maximum winds: 140 mph (220 km/h)
  - Lowest pressure: 944 mbar (hPa; 27.88 inHg)

Longest lasting system
- Name: Kiko
- Duration: 10.5 days
Storm articles
- Tropical Storm Alvin (2025)
- Hurricane Erick
- Hurricane Lorena (2025)
- Tropical Storm Mario (2025)
- Hurricane Narda (2025)
- Tropical Storm Raymond (2025)

The 2025 Pacific hurricane season was an active Pacific hurricane season, with an above average number of tropical cyclones occurring east of the International Date Line (IDL) in the Northern Hemisphere. It officially began on May 15 in the eastern Pacific (east of 140°W), and on June 1 in the central Pacific (from the IDL east to 140°W); it will end in both on November 30. These dates, adopted by convention, historically describe the period in each year when most tropical cyclogenesis occurs in these regions of the Pacific. The season's first system, Tropical Storm Alvin, developed on May 28. The last storm of the season, Tropical Storm Sonia, dissipated on October 28, with no further storms forming in November.

This timeline documents tropical cyclone formations, strengthening, weakening, landfalls, extratropical transitions, and dissipations during the season. It includes information that was not released throughout the season, meaning that data from post-storm reviews by the National Hurricane Center, such as a storm that was not initially warned upon, has been included.

The time stamp for each event is first stated using Coordinated Universal Time (UTC), the 24-hour clock where 00:00 = midnight UTC. The NHC uses both UTC and the time zone where the center of the tropical cyclone is currently located. The time zones utilized (east to west) are: Central, Mountain, Pacific and Hawaii. In this timeline, the respective area time is included in parentheses. Additionally, figures for maximum sustained winds and position estimates are rounded to the nearest 5 units (miles, or kilometers), following National Hurricane Center practice. Direct wind observations are rounded to the nearest whole number. Atmospheric pressures are listed to the nearest millibar and nearest hundredth of an inch of mercury.

== Timeline ==
=== May ===
May 15

- The Eastern Pacific hurricane season officially begins.

May 28

- 18:00 UTC (12:00 p.m. CST) at 11.5°N 104.4°W – Tropical Depression One‑E forms from a large disturbance along the eastern North Pacific monsoon trough, about 470 mi (760 km) southwest of Acapulco, Guerrero.

May 29

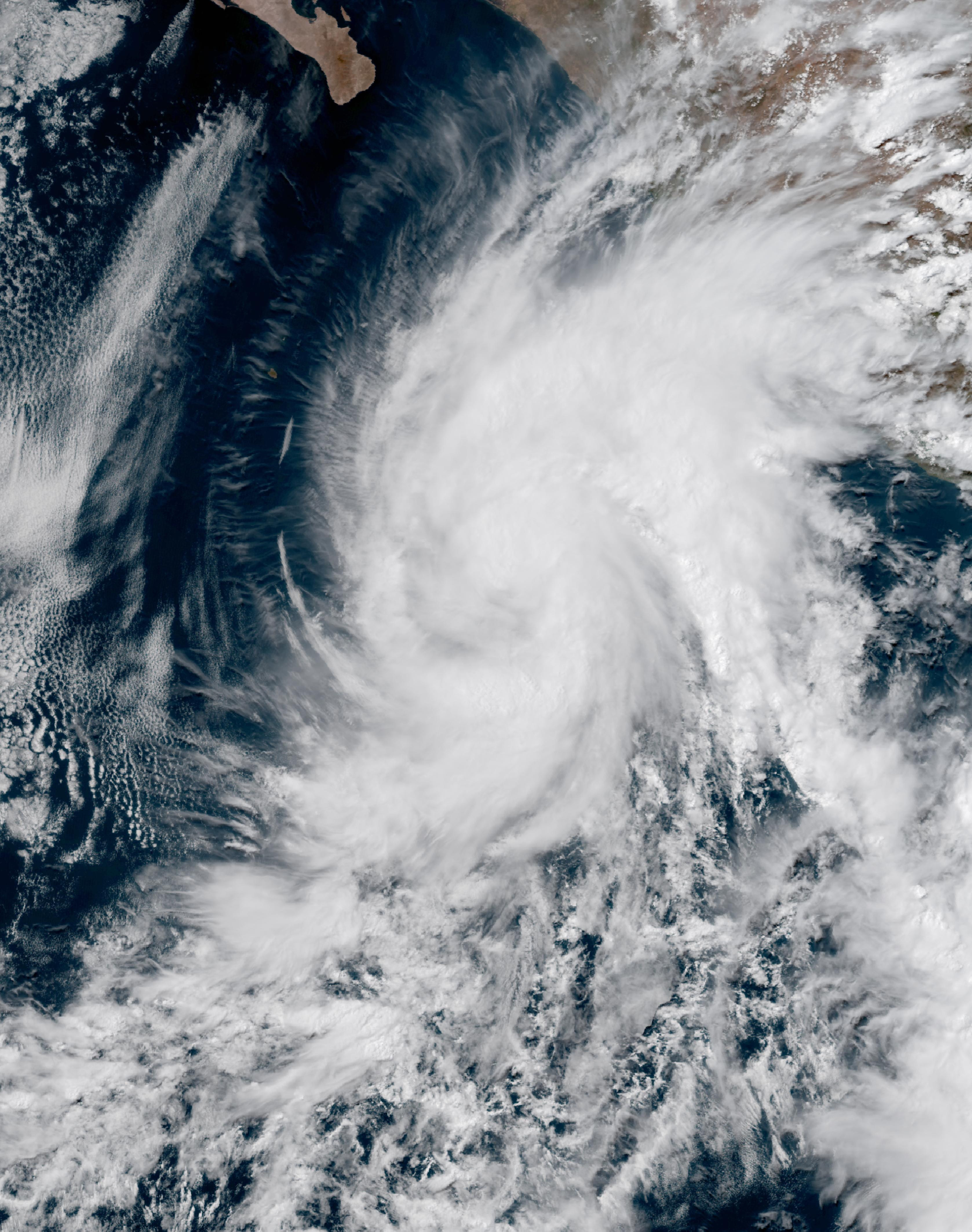
Alvin at peak intensity on May 29

- 12:00 UTC (5:00 a.m. MST) at 13.7°N 106.2°W – Tropical Depression One‑E strengthens into Tropical Storm Alvin.
- 18:00 UTC (11:00 a.m. MST) at 14.6°N 106.9°W – Tropical Storm Alvin attains its peak intensity, with maximum sustained winds of 60 mph (95 km/h) and a minimum central pressure of 999 mb (29.50 inHg).

May 31

- 06:00 UTC (11:00 p.m. MST, May 30) at 19.6°N 109.2°W – Tropical Storm Alvin degenerates into a remnant low, and later dissipates.

=== June ===
June 1

- The Central Pacific hurricane season officially begins.

June 8

- 06:00 UTC (00:00 a.m. CST) at 15.0°N 101.9°W – Tropical Storm Barbara forms from a disturbance along the eastern North Pacific monsoon trough, about 175 mi (280 km) offshore the coast of Guerrero.
- 06:00 UTC (11:00 p.m. MST, June 7) at 11.7°N 110.0°W – Tropical Depression Three‑E forms from a broad area of low pressure located within the eastern North Pacific monsoon trough.
- 12:00 UTC (5:00 a.m. MST) at 12.3°N 110.4°W – Tropical Depression Three‑E strengthens into Tropical Storm Cosme.

June 9

Barbara (right) and Cosme over the Eastern Pacific on June 9

- 06:00 UTC (11:00 p.m. MST, June 8) at 16.7°N 105.3°W – Tropical Storm Barbara strengthens into a Category 1 hurricane and simultaneously attains its peak intensity, with maximum sustained winds of 75 mph (120 km/h) and a minimum central pressure of 991 mbar (29.26 inHg).
- 18:00 UTC (11:00 a.m. MST) at 14.7°N 113.6°W – Tropical Storm Cosme attains its peak intensity, with maximum sustained winds of 70 mph (110 km/h) and a minimum central pressure of 991 mbar (29.26 inHg).

June 10

- 00:00 UTC (5:00 p.m. MST June 9) at 18.5°N 107.3°W – Hurricane Barbara weakens to a tropical storm.
- 18:00 UTC (11:00 a.m. MST) at 20.5°N 108.1°W – Tropical Storm Barbara degenerates to a remnant low, and later dissipates.

June 11

- 06:00 UTC (11:00 p.m. MST, June 10) at 16.0°N 114.5°W – Tropical Storm Cosme degenerates to a remnant low, and later dissipates.

June 13

- 12:00 UTC (6:00 a.m. CST) at 13.4°N 101.3°W – Tropical Depression Four‑E forms from a tropical wave about 290 mi (465 km) south of Zihuatanejo, Guerrero. (Note: Due to the threat the developing system posed to southwestern Mexico, the National Hurricane Center initiated advisories on it, designating it Potential Tropical Cyclone Four-E at 21:00 UTC (3:00 p.m. CST) on June 12.)
- 18:00 UTC (12:00 p.m. CST) at 14.2°N 101.8°W – Tropical Depression Four‑E strengthens into Tropical Storm Dalila.

June 14

- 18:00 UTC (12:00 p.m. CST) at 16.8°N 104.5°W – Tropical Storm Dalila attains its peak intensity, with maximum sustained winds of 65 mph (100 km/h) and a minimum central pressure of 992 mb (29.29 inHg) about 185 mi (295 km) south of Manzanillo, Colima.

June 16

- 00:00 UTC (5:00 p.m. MST, June 15) at 18.5°N 108.8°W – Tropical Storm Dalila degenerates into a remnant low, and subsequently dissipates far southwest of the southern tip of Baja California Sur.

June 17

- 00:00 UTC (6:00 p.m. CST, June 16) at 11.3°N 92.4°W – Tropical Depression Five‑E forms from a tropical wave. (Note: Due to the threat the developing system posed to southern Mexico, the National Hurricane Center initiated advisories on it, designating it Potential Tropical Cyclone Five-E at 21:00 UTC (3:00 p.m. CST) on June 16.)
- 12:00 UTC (6:00 a.m. CST) at 12.1°N 93.7°W – Tropical Depression Five‑E strengthens into Tropical Storm Erick.

June 18

- 06:00 UTC (12:00 a.m. CST) at 13.1°N 95.1°W – Tropical Storm Erick strengthens into a Category 1 hurricane about 215 mi (345 km) south of Salina Cruz, Oaxaca.
- 18:00 UTC (12:00 p.m. CST) at 14.2°N 96.3°W – Hurricane Erick intensifies to Category 2 strength about 105 mi (165 km) south of Puerto Ángel, Oaxaca.

June 19

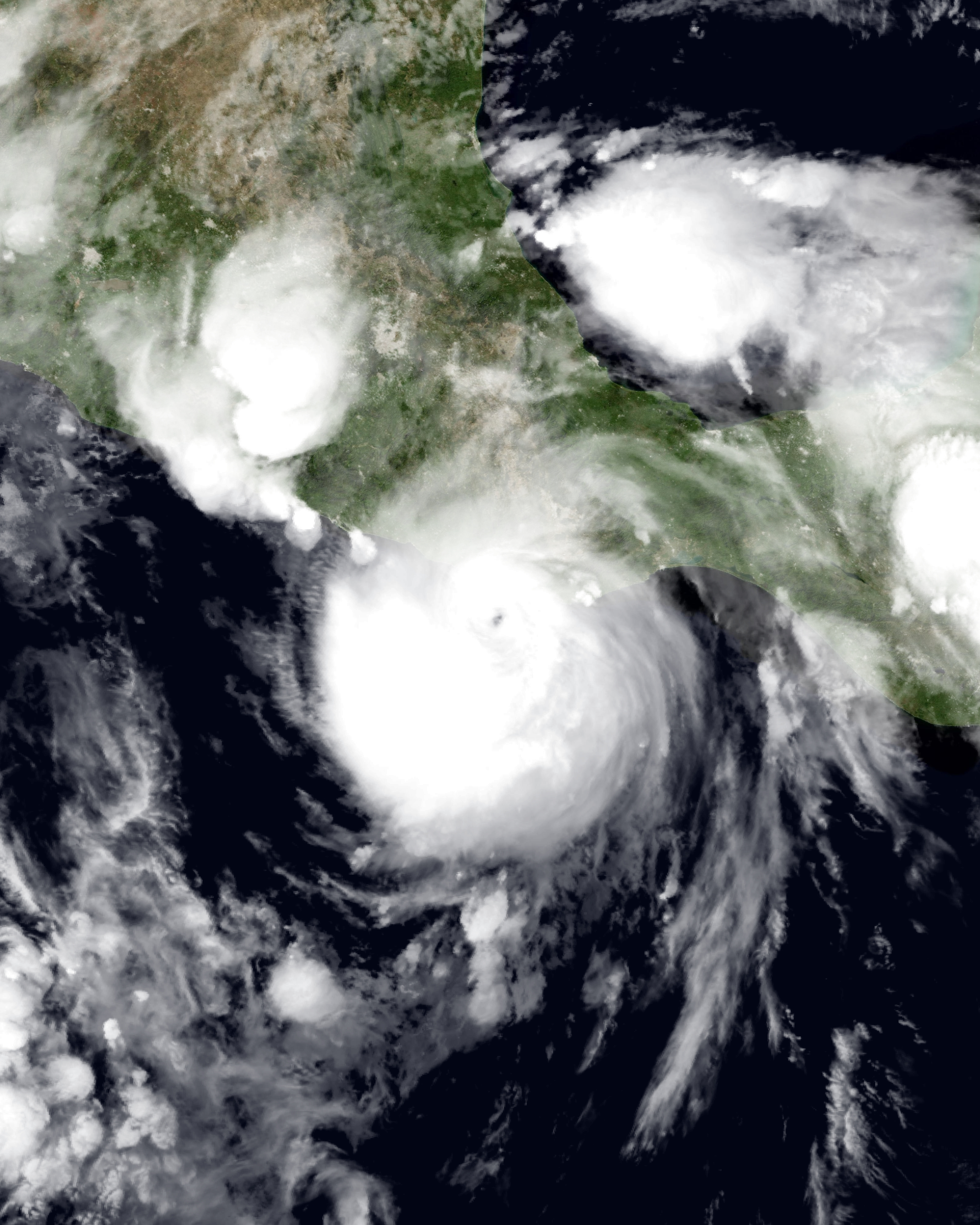
Erick at peak intensity nearing landfall in Oaxaca early on June 19

- 00:00 UTC (6:00 p.m. CST June 18) at 14.9°N 96.8°W – Hurricane Erick intensifies to Category 3 strength about 100 mi (155 km) south of Puerto Ángel.
- 06:00 UTC (12:00 a.m. CST) at 15.5°N 97.5°W – Hurricane Erick intensifies to Category 4 strength and simultaneously attains its peak intensity, with maximum sustained winds of 140 mph (220 km/h) and a minimum central pressure of 944 mb (27.88 inHg) about 70 mi (110 km) west-southwest of Puerto Ángel.
- 11:30 UTC (5:30 a.m. CST) at 16.3°N 98.3°W – Hurricane Erick weakens to Category 3 strength and simultaneously makes landfall in Santo Domingo Armenta, Oaxaca, with sustained winds of 125 mph (205 km/h).
- 18:00 UTC (12:00 p.m. CST) at 17.1°N 99.3°W – Hurricane Erick rapidly weakens to Category 1 strength inland.

June 20

- 00:00 UTC (6:00 p.m. CST, June 19) at 17.8°N 100.3°W – Hurricane Erick weakens into a tropical depression over the region's rugged terrain, and soon dissipates.

June 29

- 06:00 UTC (0:00 a.m. CST) at 13.0°N 99.1°W – Tropical Depression Six‑E forms from a tropical wave about 270 mi (435 km) south of Acapulco, Guerrero.
- 18:00 UTC (12:00 p.m. CST) at 13.4°N 100.1°W – Tropical Depression Six‑E strengthens into Tropical Storm Flossie about 200 mi (325 km) south of Acapulco.

=== July ===
July 1

- 00:00 UTC (6:00 p.m. CST, June 30) at 16.4°N 103.9°W – Tropical Storm Flossie strengthens into a Category 1 hurricane about 195 mi (315 km) south of Manzanillo, Colima.
- 18:00 UTC (12:00 p.m. CST) at 17.6°N 106.3°W – Hurricane Flossie intensifies to Category 2 strength about 155 mi (250 km) southwest of Manzanillo.

July 2

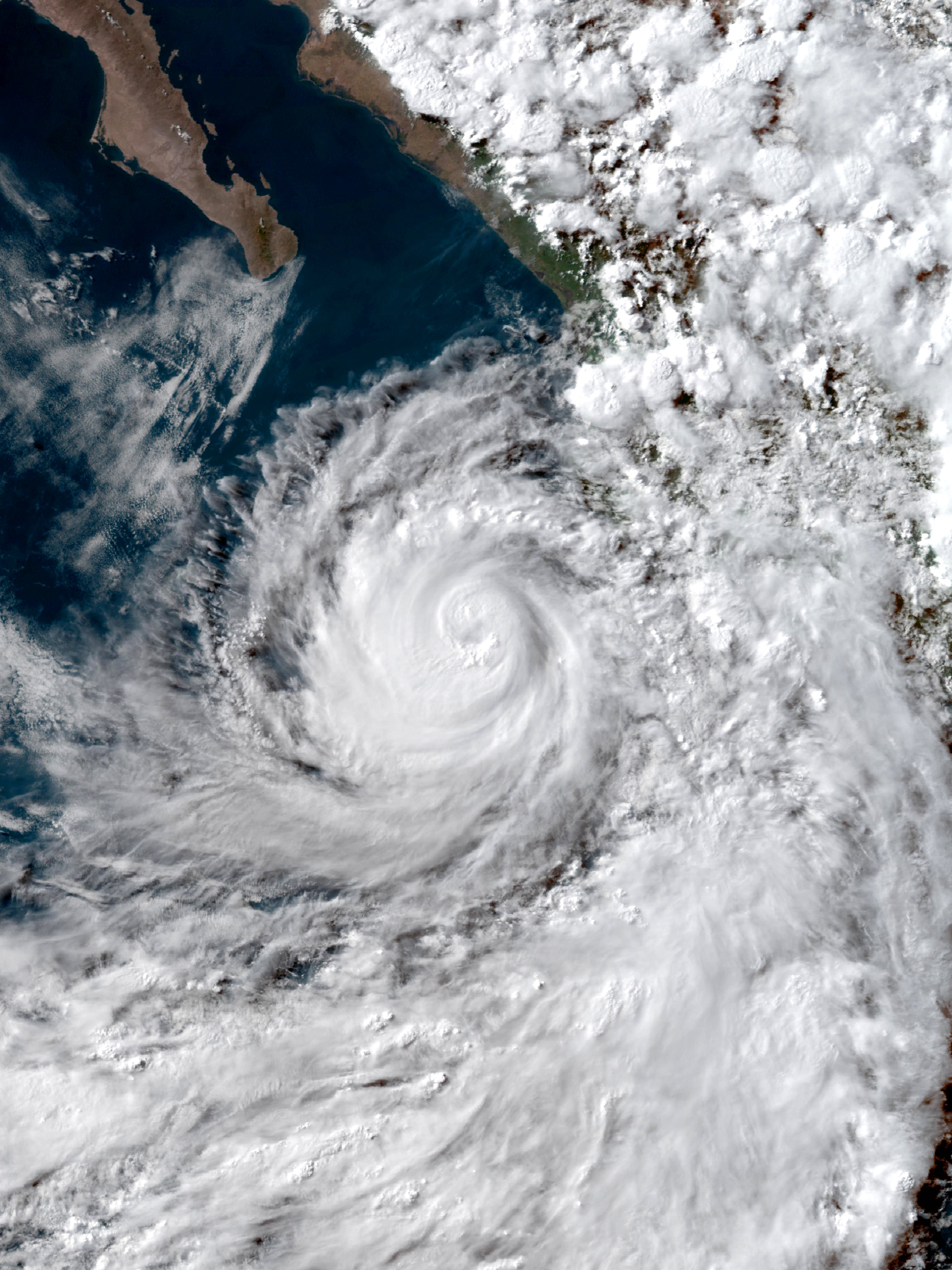
Flossie at near peak intensity off the coast of southwestern Mexico on July 2

- 00:00 UTC (5:00 p.m. MST, July 1) at 18.0°N 107.1°W – Hurricane Flossie intensifies to Category 3 strength about 185 mi (295 km) southwest of Manzanillo.
- 03:00 UTC (8:00 p.m. MST, July 1) at 18.2°N 107.5°W – Hurricane Flossie attains its peak intensity, with maximum sustained winds of 120 mph (195 km/h) and a minimum central pressure of 958 mb (28.29 inHg) about 200 mi (325 km) west of Manzanillo.
- 12:00 UTC (5:00 a.m. MST) at 18.8°N 108.7°W – Hurricane Flossie weakens to Category 2 strength about 270 mi (435 km) west of Manzanillo.

July 3

- 00:00 UTC (5:00 p.m. MST, July 2) at 19.6°N 109.9°W – Hurricane Flossie weakens to Category 1 strength about 345 mi (555 km) west of Manzanillo.
- 06:00 UTC (11:00 p.m. MST, July 2) at 20.0°N 110.6°W – Hurricane Flossie weakens to a tropical storm about 395 mi (640 km) west of Manzanillo.
- 12:00 UTC (5:00 a.m. MST) at 20.4°N 111.3°W – Tropical Storm Flossie degenerates into a remnant low about 445 mi (715 km) west of Manzanillo, and subsequently dissipates.

July 27

- 00:00 UTC (2:00 p.m. HST, July 26) at 10.9°N 144.1°W – Tropical Depression One‑C forms from a low-latitude tropical wave about 955 mi (1,535 km) southeast of Hilo, Hawaii.
- 18:00 UTC (8:00 a.m. HST) at 10.9°N 146.9°W – Tropical Depression One‑C strengthens into Tropical Storm Iona.

July 28

- 12:00 UTC (2:00 a.m. HST) at 11.9°N 143.2°W – Tropical Depression Two-C forms from a low-latitude low-pressure area about 950 mi (1,530 km) southeast of Hilo, Hawaii.
- 18:00 UTC (8:00 a.m. HST) at 10.7°N 150.6°W – Tropical Storm Iona strengthens into a Category 1 hurricane.
- 18:00 UTC (8:00 a.m. HST) at 12.1°N 144.1°W – Tropical Depression Two‑C strengthens into Tropical Storm Keli.

July 29

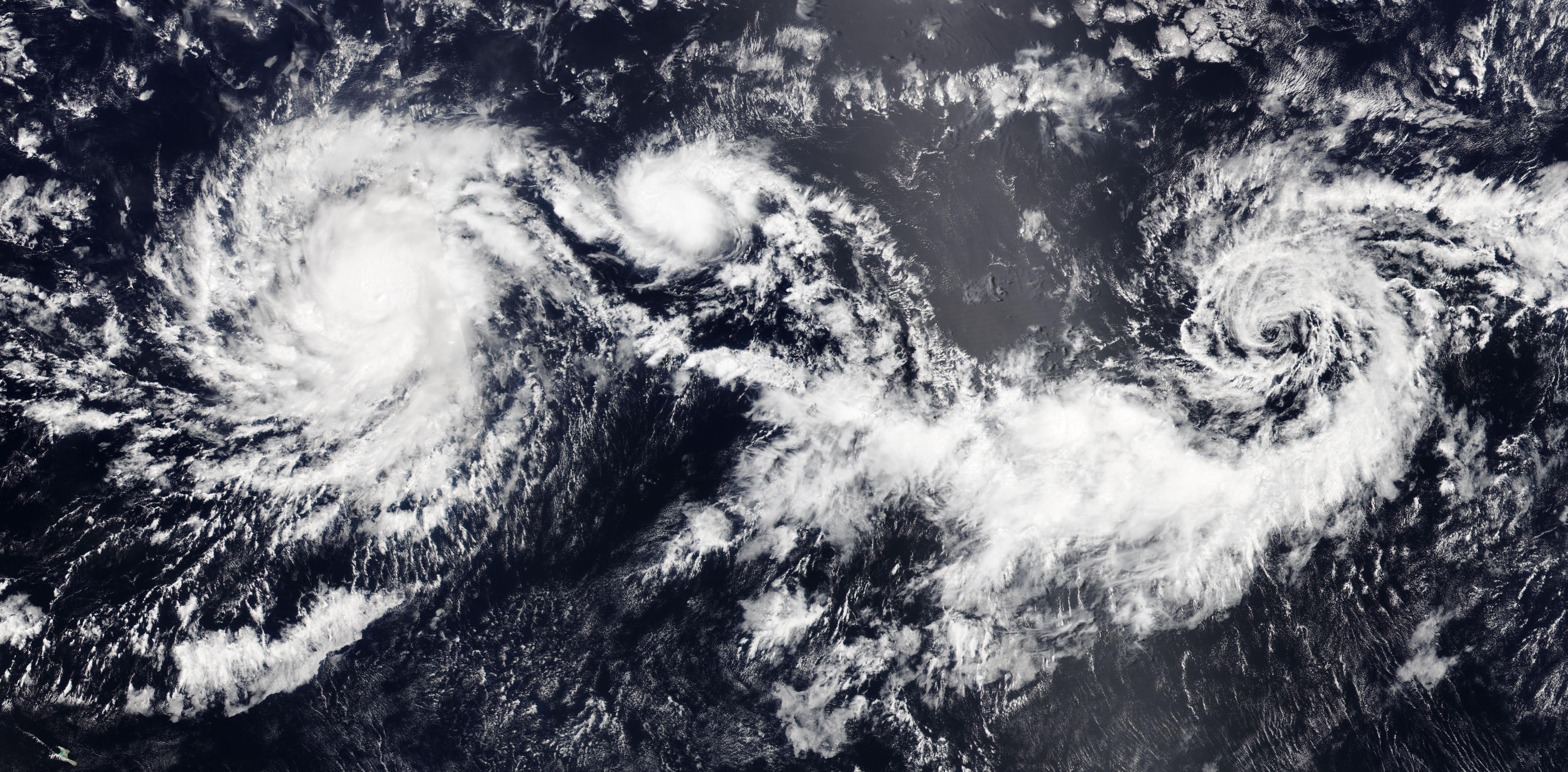
Two simultaneous tropical systems, Hurricane Iona (left), and Tropical Storm Keli (center), along with Invest 98E (right), on July 29

- 06:00 UTC (8:00 p.m. HST, July 28) at 10.8°N 152.6°W – Hurricane Iona rapidly intensifies to Category 3 strength.
- 06:00 UTC (8:00 p.m. HST, July 28) at 12.3°N 146.1°W – Tropical Storm Keli attains its peak intensity, with maximum sustained winds of 50 mph (85 km/h) and minimum central pressure of 1003 mb (29.62 inHg), about 785 mi (1,260 km) southeast of Hilo.
- 12:00 UTC (2:00 a.m. HST) at 10.8°N 153.7°W – Hurricane Iona intensifies to Category 4 strength, and simultaneously attains its peak intensity with maximum sustained winds of 130 mph (215 km/h) and minimum central pressure of 956 mb (28.23 inHg), about 620 mi (1,000 km) south of Hilo.
- 18:00 UTC (8:00 a.m. HST) at 10.9°N 155.0°W – Hurricane Iona weakens to Category 3 strength about 605 mi (970 km) south of Hilo.
- 18:00 UTC (8:00 a.m. HST) at 13.6°N 154.7°W – Tropical Storm Keli dissipates about 420 mi (675 km) south of Hilo due to interaction with Hurricane Iona to its west and a larger disturbance to its east.

July 30

- 06:00 UTC (8:00 p.m. HST July 29) at 11.2°N 157.9°W – Hurricane Iona weakens to Category 2 strength.
- 12:00 UTC (2:00 a.m. HST) at 11.4°N 159.6°W – Hurricane Iona weakens to Category 1 strength.
- 18:00 UTC (8:00 a.m. HST) at 11.6°N 161.7°W – Hurricane Iona weakens to a tropical storm.

July 31

- 00:00 UTC (2:00 p.m. HST, July 30) at 12.5°N 113.3°W – Tropical Storm Gil forms about 750 mi (1,205 km) south-southwest of the southern tip of the Baja California peninsula.

=== August ===
August 1

- 06:00 UTC (8:00 p.m. HST, July 31) at 13.6°N 173.6°W – Tropical Storm Iona weakens to a tropical depression about 430 mi (695 km) east of the International Date Line, and later dissipates while still within the Central Pacific basin.

August 2

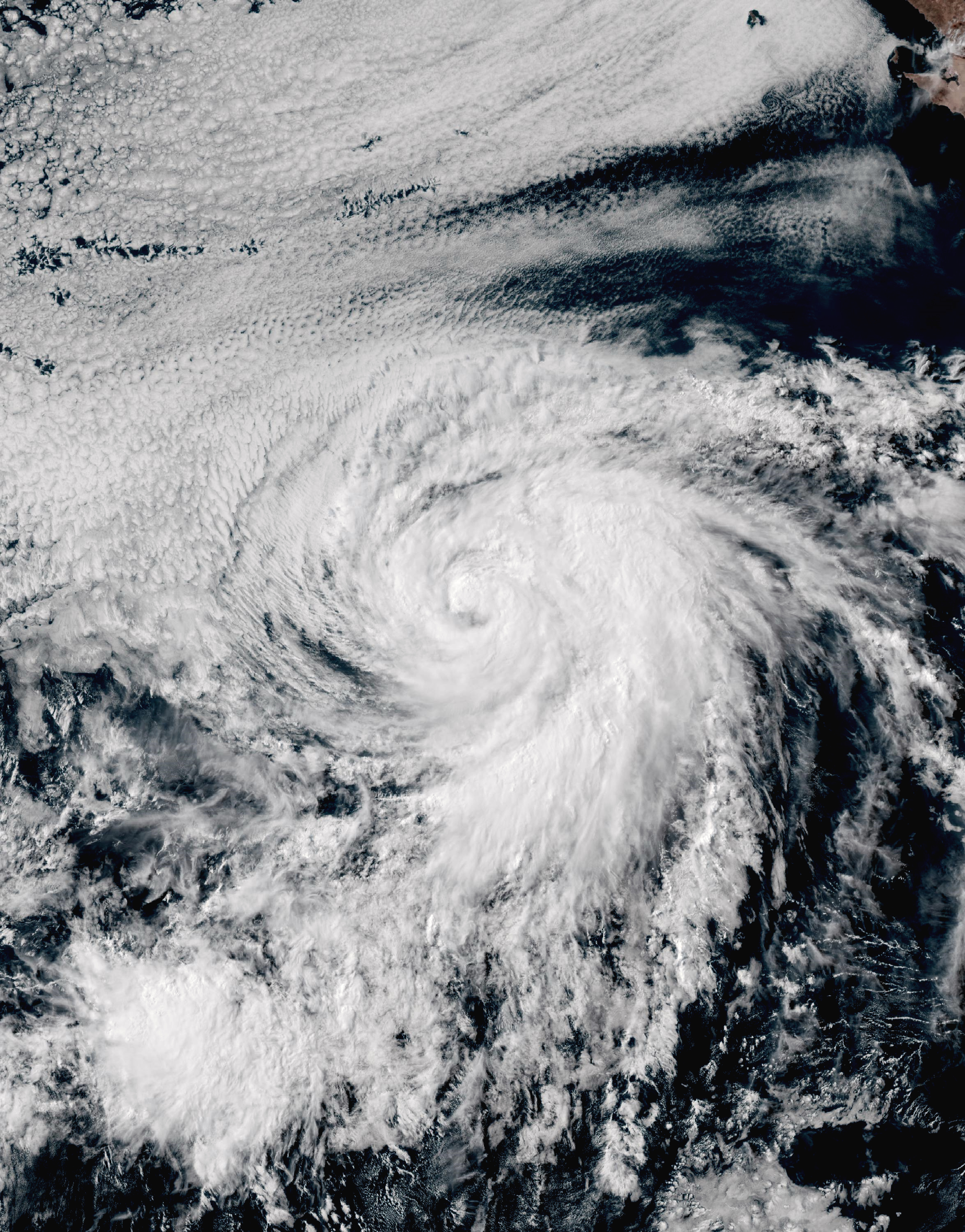
Gil at peak intensity on August 2

- 00:00 UTC (2:00 p.m. HST, August 1) at 16.2°N 124.3°W – Tropical Storm Gil strengthens into a Category 1 hurricane, and simultaneously attains its peak intensity, with maximum sustained winds of 75 mph (120 km/h) and minimum central pressure of 991 mb (29.26 inHg), about 1,045 mi (1,685 km) southwest of the southern tip of the Baja California peninsula.
- 18:00 UTC (8:00 a.m. HST) at 18.4°N 129.5°W – Hurricane Gil weakens to a tropical storm.

August 3

- 12:00 UTC (2:00 a.m. HST) at 20.3°N 134.8°W – Tropical Storm Gil degenerates into a remnant low, and subsequently dissipates.

August 4

- 06:00 UTC (8:00 p.m. HST, August 3) at 13.4°N 117.5°W – Tropical Depression Eight‑E forms from a tropical wave about 830 mi (1,335 km) southwest of the Baja California peninsula.
- 12:00 UTC (2:00 a.m. HST) at 14.1°N 118.8°W – Tropical Depression Eight‑E strengthens into Tropical Storm Henriette about 845 mi (1,360 km) southwest of the Baja California peninsula.

August 6

- 12:00 UTC (6:00 a.m. CST) at 13.0°N 96.5°W – A tropical Depression forms from a low-pressure area about 340 mi (545 km) southeast of Acapulco.
- 18:00 UTC (12:00 p.m. CST) at 13.8°N 98.2°W – The tropical depression southeast of Acapulco strengthens into Tropical Storm Ivo.

August 8

- 06:00 UTC (8:00 p.m. HST, August 7) at 19.1°N 139.3°W – Tropical Storm Henriette degenerates into a remnant low far to the southwest of the Baja California peninsula while approaching the central Pacific basin.

August 9

- 00:00 UTC (5:00 p.m. MST, August 8) at 20.5°N 111.3°W – Tropical Storm Ivo attains its peak intensity with maximum sustained winds of 65 mph (100 km/h) and minimum central pressure of 998 mb (29.47 inHg), about 195 mi (315 km) southwest of the Baja California peninsula.
- 06:00 UTC (8:00 p.m. HST, August 8) at 20.4°N 145.1°W – The remnants of Tropical Storm Henriette regenerate into a tropical depression within the central Pacific basin about 835 mi (1,345 km) east of Hawaii.
- 18:00 UTC (8:00 a.m. HST) at 21.8°N 147.5°W – Tropical Depression Henriette restrengthens into a tropical storm about 675 mi (1,085 km) east of Hawaii.

August 10

- 18:00 UTC (8:00 a.m. HST) at 25.2°N 151.9°W – Tropical Storm Henriette strengthens into a Category 1 hurricane about 465 mi (750 km) northeast of Hawaii.

August 11

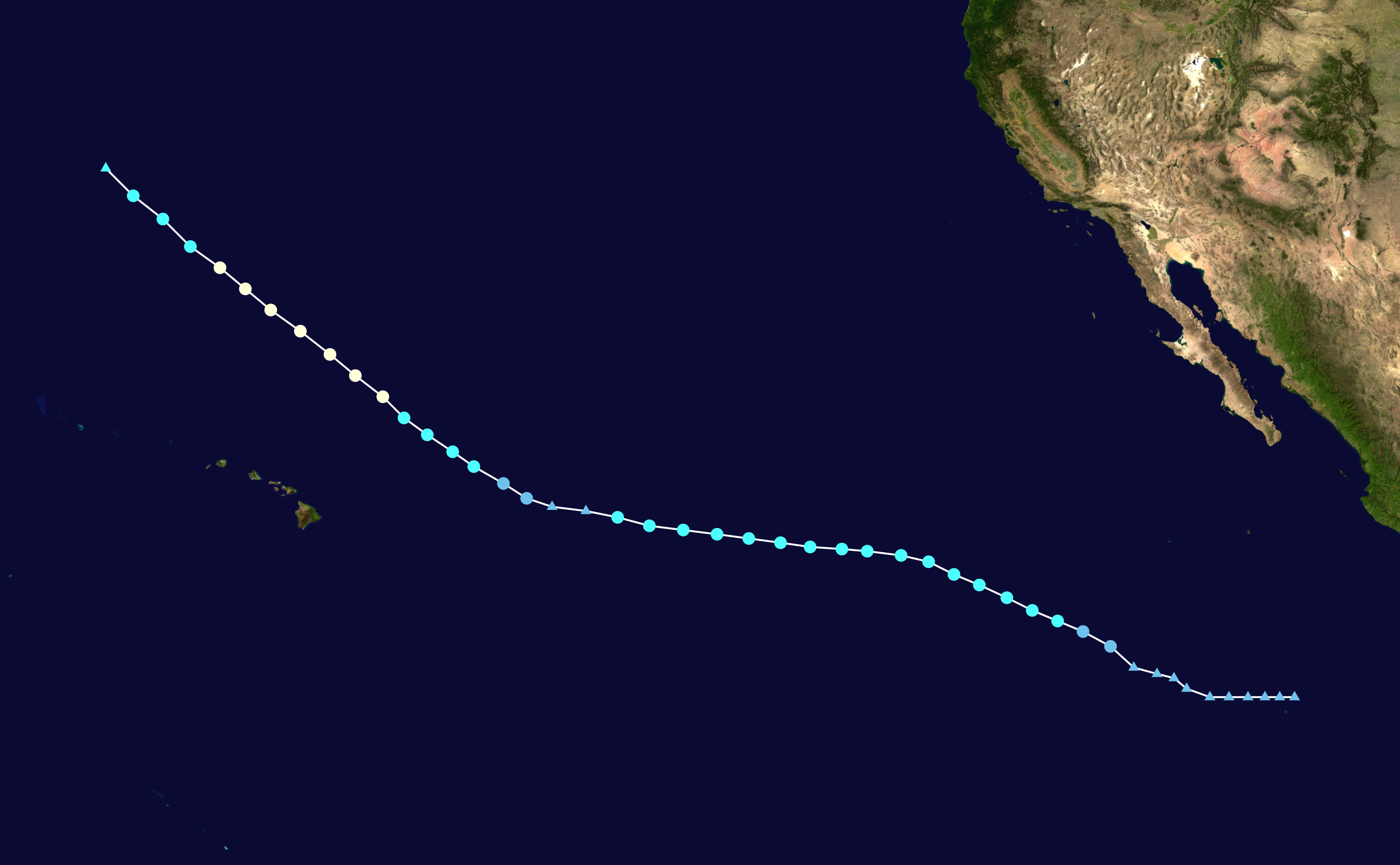
Henriette's path August 4–13 Map key Saffir–Simpson scale Tropical depression (≤38 mph, ≤62 km/h) Tropical storm (39–73 mph, 63–118 km/h) Category 1 (74–95 mph, 119–153 km/h) Category 2 (96–110 mph, 154–177 km/h) Category 3 (111–129 mph, 178–208 km/h) Category 4 (130–156 mph, 209–251 km/h) Category 5 (≥157 mph, ≥252 km/h) Unknown Storm type Tropical cyclone Subtropical cyclone Extratropical cyclone, remnant low, tropical disturbance, or monsoon depression

- 00:00 UTC (5:00 p.m. PDT, August 10) at 22.3°N 117.4°W – Tropical Storm Ivo weakens into a tropical depression about 480 mi (770 km) west of the Baja California peninsula.
- 06:00 UTC (11:00 p.m. PDT, August 10) at 22.6°N 118.2°W – Tropical Depression Ivo degenerates into a remnant low west of the Baja California peninsula, and later dissipates.
- 12:00 UTC (2:00 a.m. HST) at 28.3°N 155.8°W – Hurricane Henriette attains its peak intensity with maximum sustained winds of 85 mph (140 km/h) and minimum central pressure of 986 mb (29.12 inHg), about 490 mi (785 km) north of Hawaii.

August 12

- 12:00 UTC (2:00 a.m. HST) at 32.3°N 161.0°W – Hurricane Henriette weakens into a tropical storm about 765 mi (1,230 km) northeast of Hawaii.

August 13

- 06:00 UTC (8:00 p.m. HST, August 12) at 36.7°N 165.6°W – Tropical Storm Henriette degenerates into a remnant low far to the northwest of Hawaii, and subsequently dissipates.

August 24

- 18:00 UTC (11:00 a.m. MST) at 15.7°N 109.3°W – Tropical Depression Ten-E forms from a tropical wave about 520 mi (835 km) south of the southern tip of the Baja California peninsula.

August 25

- 06:00 UTC (11:00 p.m. MST, August 24) at 16.5°N 111.6°W – Tropical Depression Ten-E strengthens into Tropical Storm Juliette about 460 mi (740 km) south-southwest of the southern tip of the Baja California peninsula.

August 26

- 12:00 UTC (5:00 a.m. PDT) at 18.7°N 116.2°W – Tropical Storm Juliette attains its peak intensity with maximum sustained winds of 70 mph (110 km/h) and minimum central pressure of 994 mb (29.35 inHg), about 90 mi (150 km) west of Clarion Island.

August 28

- 06:00 UTC (11:00 p.m. PDT, August 27) at 25.1°N 120.7°W – Tropical Storm Juliette degenerates into a remnant low west of the Baja California peninsula, and subsequently dissipates.

August 31

- 00:00 UTC (2:00 p.m. HST, August 30) at 14.4°N 121.1°W – Tropical Depression Eleven-E forms from a tropical wave, about 950 mi (1,530 km) southwest of the southern tip of the Baja California Peninsula.
- 12:00 UTC (2:00 a.m. HST) at 14.4°N 122.6°W – Tropical Depression Eleven-E strengthens into Tropical Storm Kiko, about 1,025 mi (1,650 km) southwest of the southern tip of the Baja California Peninsula.

=== September ===
September 2

- 00:00 UTC (6:00 p.m. CST, September 1) at 16.9°N 104.8°W – Tropical Depression Twelve-E forms from a tropical wave about 140 mi (220 km) south of Manzanillo, Colima.
- 06:00 UTC (8:00 p.m. HST, September 1) at 13.8°N 127.6°W – Tropical Storm Kiko strengthens into a Category 1 hurricane, about 1,325 mi (2,130 km) southwest of the southern tip of the Baja California Peninsula.
- 06:00 UTC (11:00 p.m. MST, September 1) at 17.3°N 106.3°W – Tropical Depression Twelve-E strengthens into Tropical Storm Lorena about 175 mi (280 km) southwest Manzanillo.

September 3

- 00:00 UTC (2:00 p.m. HST, September 2) at 13.8°N 129.2°W – Hurricane Kiko intensifies to Category 2 strength, about 1,415 mi (2,280 km) southwest of the southern tip of the Baja California Peninsula.
- 06:00 UTC (11:00 p.m. MST, September 2) at 20.8°N 110.0°W – Tropical Storm Lorena strengthens into a Category 1 hurricane about 100 mi (155 km) southwest of Cabo San Lucas, Baja California Sur.
- 18:00 UTC (8:00 a.m. HST) at 13.9°N 131.1°W – Hurricane Kiko intensifies to Category 3 strength, about 1,525 mi (2,455 km) southwest of the southern tip of the Baja California Peninsula.

September 4

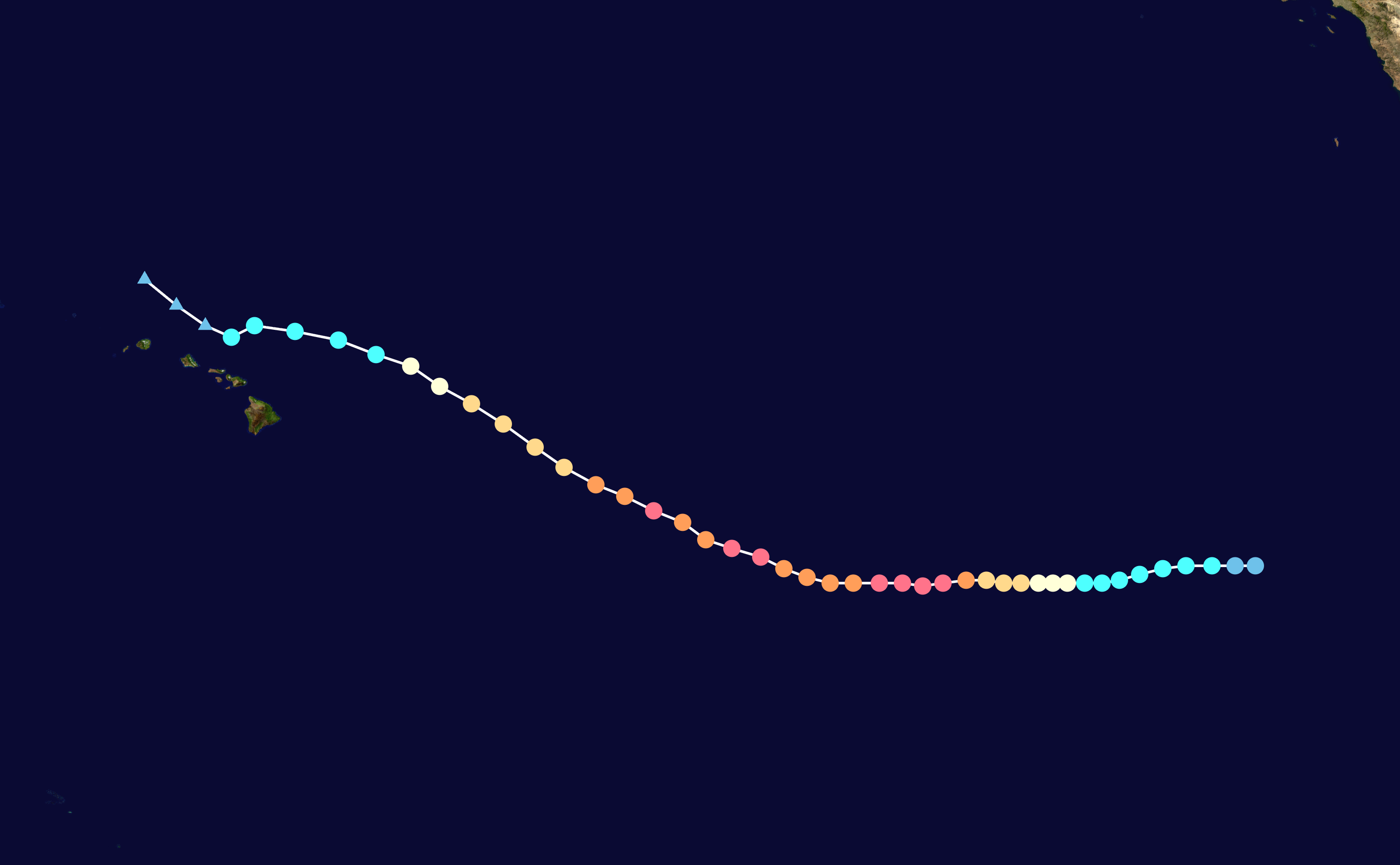
Kiko's path August 31 – September 10 Map key Saffir–Simpson scale Tropical depression (≤38 mph, ≤62 km/h) Tropical storm (39–73 mph, 63–118 km/h) Category 1 (74–95 mph, 119–153 km/h) Category 2 (96–110 mph, 154–177 km/h) Category 3 (111–129 mph, 178–208 km/h) Category 4 (130–156 mph, 209–251 km/h) Category 5 (≥157 mph, ≥252 km/h) Unknown Storm type Tropical cyclone Subtropical cyclone Extratropical cyclone, remnant low, tropical disturbance, or monsoon depression

- 00:00 UTC (2:00 p.m. HST, September 3) at 13.8°N 131.9°W – Hurricane Kiko intensifies to Category 4 strength, and simultaneously attains its peak intensity with maximum sustained winds of 145 mph (230 km/h) and minimum central pressure of 945 mb (27.91 inHg), about 1,575 mi (2,535 km) southwest of the southern tip of the Baja California Peninsula.
- 00:00 UTC (5:00 p.m. MST, September 3) at 23.1°N 112.8°W – Hurricane Lorena attains its peak intensity with maximum sustained winds of 85 mph (140 km/h) and minimum central pressure of 981 mb (28.97 inHg), about 185 mi (295 km) west of Cabo San Lucas.
- 12:00 UTC (5:00 a.m. MST) at 24.0°N 114.0°W – Hurricane Lorena weakens into a tropical storm about 270 mi (435 km) west of Cabo San Lucas.

September 5

- 00:00 UTC (2:00 p.m. HST, September 4) at 13.8°N 135.0°W – Hurricane Kiko weakens to Category 3 strength, about 1,600 mi (2,575 km) east of Hawaii.
- 00:00 UTC (5:00 p.m. PDT, September 3) at 24.5°N 115.0°W – Tropical Storm Lorena transitions into a post-tropical cyclone about 340 mi (545 km) west of Cabo San Lucas, and subsequently dissipates.

September 6

- 00:00 UTC (2:00 p.m. HST, September 5) at 14.7°N 138.2°W – Hurricane Kiko re-intensifies to Category 4 strength.
- 06:00 UTC (8:00 p.m. HST, September 5) at 15.0°N 139.2°W – Hurricane Kiko attains secondary-peak sustained winds of 140 mph (220 km/h), about 1,380 mi (2,220 km) east of Hawaii.
- 12:00 UTC (2:00 a.m. HST) at 15.3°N 140.1°W – Hurricane Kiko weakens to Category 3 strength, shortly after crossing over into the central Pacific basin.

September 7

- 18:00 UTC (8:00 a.m. HST) at 17.8°N 145.0°W – Hurricane Kiko weakens to Category 2 strength, about 885 mi (1,425 km) east of Hawaii.

September 8

- 18:00 UTC (8:00 a.m. HST) at 20.6°N 149.3°W – Hurricane Kiko weakens to Category 1 strength, about 565 mi (905 km) east of Hawaii.

September 9

- 06:00 UTC (8:00 p.m. HST, September 8) at 21.7°N 151.5°W – Hurricane Kiko weakens into a tropical storm, about 420 mi (675 km) east of Hawaii.

September 10

- 12:00 UTC (2:00 a.m. HST) at 22.7°N 157.4°W – Tropical Storm Kiko degenerates into a remnant low, about 90 mi (150 km) northeast of Hawaii.

September 11

- 06:00 UTC (12:00 a.m. CST. ) at 14.7°N 98.0°W – Tropical Depression Thirteen-E forms from a tropical wave about 185 mi (295 km) southeast of Acapulco, Guerrero.

September 12

- 00:00 UTC (6:00 p.m. CST, September 11) at 16.0°N 99.1°W – Tropical Depression Thirteen-E strengthens into Tropical Storm Mario and simultaneously attains its initial peak intensity, with maximum sustained winds of 40 mph (65 km/h) and minimum central pressure of 1006 mb (29.71 inHg), about 80 mi (130 km) southeast of Acapulco.
- 18:00 UTC (12:00 p.m. CST) at 17.3°N 102.5°W – Tropical Storm Mario weakens into a tropical depression about 185 mi (295 km) west of Acapulco.

September 13

- 00:00 UTC (6:00 p.m. CST, September 12) at 17.8°N 104.0°W – Tropical Depression Mario opens into a surface trough about 290 mi (465 km) west of Acapulco.

September 14

- 06:00 UTC (11:00 p.m. MST, September 13) at 18.1°N 109.1°W – The remnants of Tropical Storm Mario regenerate into a tropical depression about 340 mi (545 km) south of the southern tip of the Baja California peninsula.
- 12:00 UTC (5:00 a.m. MST) at 18.4°N 109.7°W – Tropical Depression Mario re-strengthens into a tropical storm about 310 mi (500 km) south of the southern tip of the Baja California peninsula.

September 15

- 12:00 UTC (5:00 a.m. MST) at 19.9°N 112.8°W – Tropical Storm Mario attains its peak intensity, with maximum sustained winds of 65 mph (100 km/h) and minimum central pressure of 994 mb (29.35 inHg), about 280 mi (455 km) southwest of the southern tip of the Baja California peninsula.

September 16

- 12:00 UTC (5:00 a.m. PDT) at 22.0°N 116.3°W – Tropical Storm Mario degenerates into post-tropical low west of Baja California Sur, and subsequently dissipates.

September 21

- 18:00 UTC (12:00 p.m. CST) at 14.4°N 99.4°W – Tropical Storm Narda forms from a tropical wave about 240 mi (390 km) south-southeast of Zihuatanejo, Guerrero.

September 23

- 06:00 UTC (11:00 p.m. MST, September 22) at 15.8°N 105.6°W – Tropical Storm Narda strengthens into a Category 1 hurricane about 295 mi (470 km) southwest of Zihuatanejo.

September 24

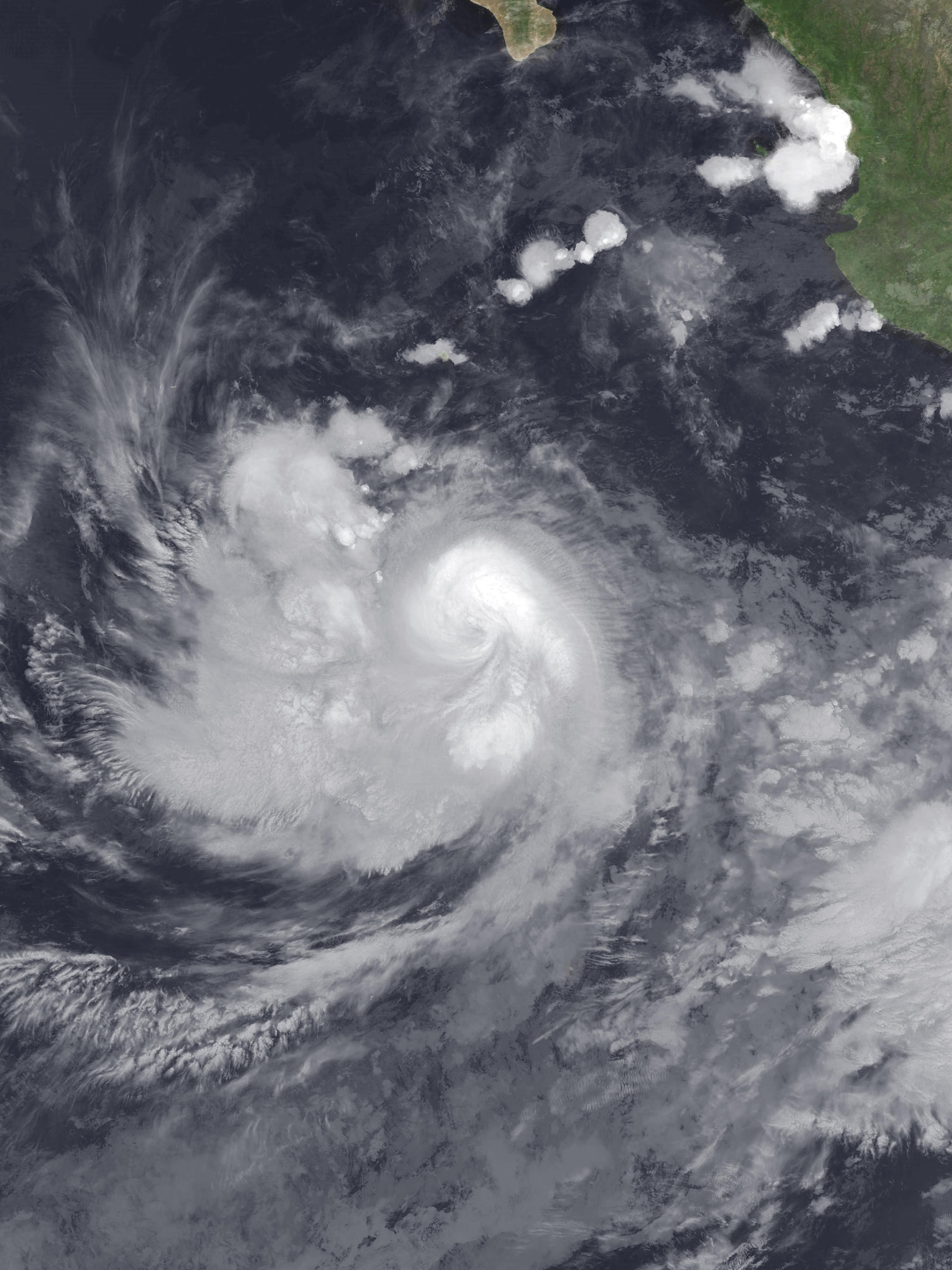
Narda at peak intensity on September 24

- 00:00 UTC (5:00 p.m. MST, September 23) at 15.3°N 108.8°W – Hurricane Narda intensifies into a Category 2 hurricane far to the south of the Baja California peninsula.
- 06:00 UTC (11:00 p.m. MST, September 23) at 15.2°N 109.9°W – Hurricane Narda attains its peak intensity with maximum sustained winds of 105 mph (165 km/h) and minimum central pressure of 970 mb (28.64 inHg), far to the south of the Baja California peninsula.

September 25

- 00:00 UTC (5:00 p.m. MST, September 24) at 15.3°N 112.9°W – Hurricane Narda weakens into a Category 1 hurricane far to the south-southwest of the Baja California peninsula.

September 28

- 00:00 UTC (5:00 p.m. PDT, September 27) at 18.5°N 125.5°W – Hurricane Narda weakens into a tropical storm far to the west-southwest of the Baja California peninsula.
- 18:00 UTC (2:00 p.m. PDT) at 20.1°N 125.5°W – Tropical Storm Narda degenerates into a remnant low far to the west of the Baja California peninsula, and subsequently dissipates.

September 30

- 00:00 UTC (4:00 p.m. MST, September 29) at 9.3°N 112.4°W – Tropical Depression Fifteen-E forms from a convective complex about 950 mi (1,530 km) south of the southern tip of the Baja California Peninsula.
- 12:00 UTC (5:00 a.m. MST) at 9.5°N 113.3°W – Tropical Depression Fifteen-E strengthens into Tropical Storm Octave about 955 mi (1,535 km) south-southwest of the southern tip of the Baja California peninsula.

=== October ===
October 4

- 12:00 UTC (5:00 a.m. MST) at 15.2°N 106.3°W – A tropical depression forms from a monsoon trough about 300 mi (480 km) south-southwest of Manzanillo, Colima.
- 18:00 UTC (11:00 a.m. MST) at 15.4°N 106.5°W – The newly formed tropical depression strengrhens into Tropical Storm Priscilla about 295 mi (470 km) south-southwest of Manzanillo.

October 5

- 06:00 UTC (11:00 p.m. PDT, October 4) at 15.4°N 124.2°W – Tropical Storm Octave strengthens into a Category 1 hurricane about 1,070 mi (1,720 km) west-southwest of the southern tip of the Baja California peninsula, and abruptly reverses direction.

October 6

Octave (left) and Priscilla (right) on October 6

- 00:00 UTC (5:00 p.m. PDT, October 5) at 16.2°N 123.1°W – Hurricane Octave attains its peak intensity, with maximum sustained winds of 90 mph (150 km/h) and minimum central pressure of 980 mb (28.94 inHg), about 980 mi (1,575 km) west-southwest of the southern tip of the Baja California peninsula.
- 00:00 UTC (5:00 p.m. MST, October 5) at 16.6°N 107.1°W – Tropical Storm Priscilla strengthens into a Category 1 hurricane about 290 mi (465 km) south-southwest of Cabo Corrientes, Cabo Corrientes, Jalisco.
- 12:00 UTC (5:00 a.m. PDT) at 16.3°N 121.9°W – Hurricane Octave weakens into a tropical storm about 905 mi (1,455 km) west-southwest of the southern tip of the Baja California peninsula.

October 7

- 06:00 UTC (11:00 p.m. MST, October 6) at 19.1°N 109.0°W – Hurricane Priscilla intensifies into a Category 2 hurricane about 235 mi (375 km) west-southwest of Cabo Corrientes.
- 18:00 UTC (11:00 a.m. MST) at 19.7°N 110.5°W – Hurricane Priscilla intensifies into a Category 3 hurricane and simultaneously attains its peak intensity with maximum sustained winds maximum sustained winds of 115 mph (185 km/h) and minimum central pressure of 954 mb (28.17 inHg), about 230 mi (370 km) south-southwest of the southern tip of the Baja California peninsula.

October 8

- 00:00 UTC (5:00 p.m. MST, October 7) at 20.3°N 111.2°W – Hurricane Priscilla weakens into a Category 2 hurricane about 200 mi (325 km) south-southwest of the southern tip of the Baja California peninsula.
- 06:00 UTC (11:00 p.m. MST, October 7) at 20.7°N 111.7°W – Hurricane Priscilla weakens into a Category 1 hurricane about 195 mi (315 km) southwest of the southern tip of the Baja California peninsula.
- 18:00 UTC (11:00 a.m. MST) at 21.7°N 112.7°W – Hurricane Priscilla weakens into a tropical storm about 200 mi (325 km) west-southwest of the southern tip of the Baja California peninsula.

October 9

- 06:00 UTC (12:00 a.m. CST) at 15.9°N 99.0°W – Tropical Depression Seventeen-E forms from a broad area of low pressure associated with the eastern North Pacific monsoon trough about 85 mi (140 km) southeast of Acapulco, Guerrero.
- 12:00 UTC (5:00 a.m MST) at 17.6°N 111.0°W – Tropical Storm Octave degenerates into a post-tropical low about 380 mi (610 km) south of the southern tip of the Baja California peninsula, and later dissipates.
- 12:00 UTC (6:00 p.m. CST) at 15.9°N 99.9°W – Tropical Depression Seventeen-E strengthens into Tropical Storm Raymond about 70 mi (110 km) south of Acapulco.

October 10

- 06:00 UTC (12:00 a.m. CST) at 17.0°N 102.9°W – Tropical Storm Raymond attains its peak intensity, with maximum sustained winds of 60 mph (95 km/h) and minimum central pressure of 998 mb (29.47 inHg), while paralleling the coast of southwestern Mexico.
- 18:00 UTC (11:00 a.m. PDT) at 26.1°N 115.4°W – Tropical Storm Priscilla weakens into a tropical depression about 410 mi (655 km) northwest of the southern tip of the Baja California peninsula.

October 11

- 00:00 UTC (5:00 p.m. PDT, October 10) at 26.1°N 115.3°W – Tropical Storm Priscilla degenerates into a remnant low about 405 mi (650 km) northwest of the southern tip of the Baja California peninsula.
- 18:00 UTC (11:00 a.m. MST) at 21.8°N 109.6°W – Tropical Storm Raymond degenerates into a remnant low while approaching the southern tip of the Baja California peninsula, and subsequently dissipates.

October 24

- 06:00 UTC (11:00 p.m. PDT, October 27) at 13.1°N 113.4°W – Tropical Depression Eighteen-E forms from a tropical wave about 710 mi (1,140 km) south-southwest of the southern tip of the Baja California peninsula.

October 25

- 00:00 UTC (5:00 p.m. PDT, October 24) at 13.2°N 116.4°W – Tropical Depression Eighteen-E strengthens into Tropical Storm Sonia about 795 mi (1,280 km) southwest of the southern tip of the Baja California peninsula.
- 18:00 UTC (11:00 a.m. PDT) at 13.4°N 118.7°W – Tropical Storm Sonia attains its peak intensity with maximum sustained winds of 50 mph (85 km/h) and minimum central pressure of 1001 mb (29.56 inHg), about 875 mi (1,410 km) southwest of the southern tip of the Baja California peninsula.

October 29

- 00:00 UTC (5:00 p.m. PDT, October 28) at 15.3°N 124.8°W – Tropical Storm Sonia degenerates into a post-tropical remnant low about 1,105 mi (1,780 km) west-southwest of the southern tip of the Baja California peninsula, and later dissipates.

=== November ===
- No tropical cyclones form in either the eastern or central Pacific basins during the month of November.

November 30

- The 2025 Pacific hurricane season officially ends in the Eastern and Central Pacific basins.

== See also ==
- Timeline of the 2025 Atlantic hurricane season
- Tropical cyclones in 2025
- List of Pacific hurricanes
