= Hurricane Kiko (1989) =

Category 3 Pacific hurricane in 1989

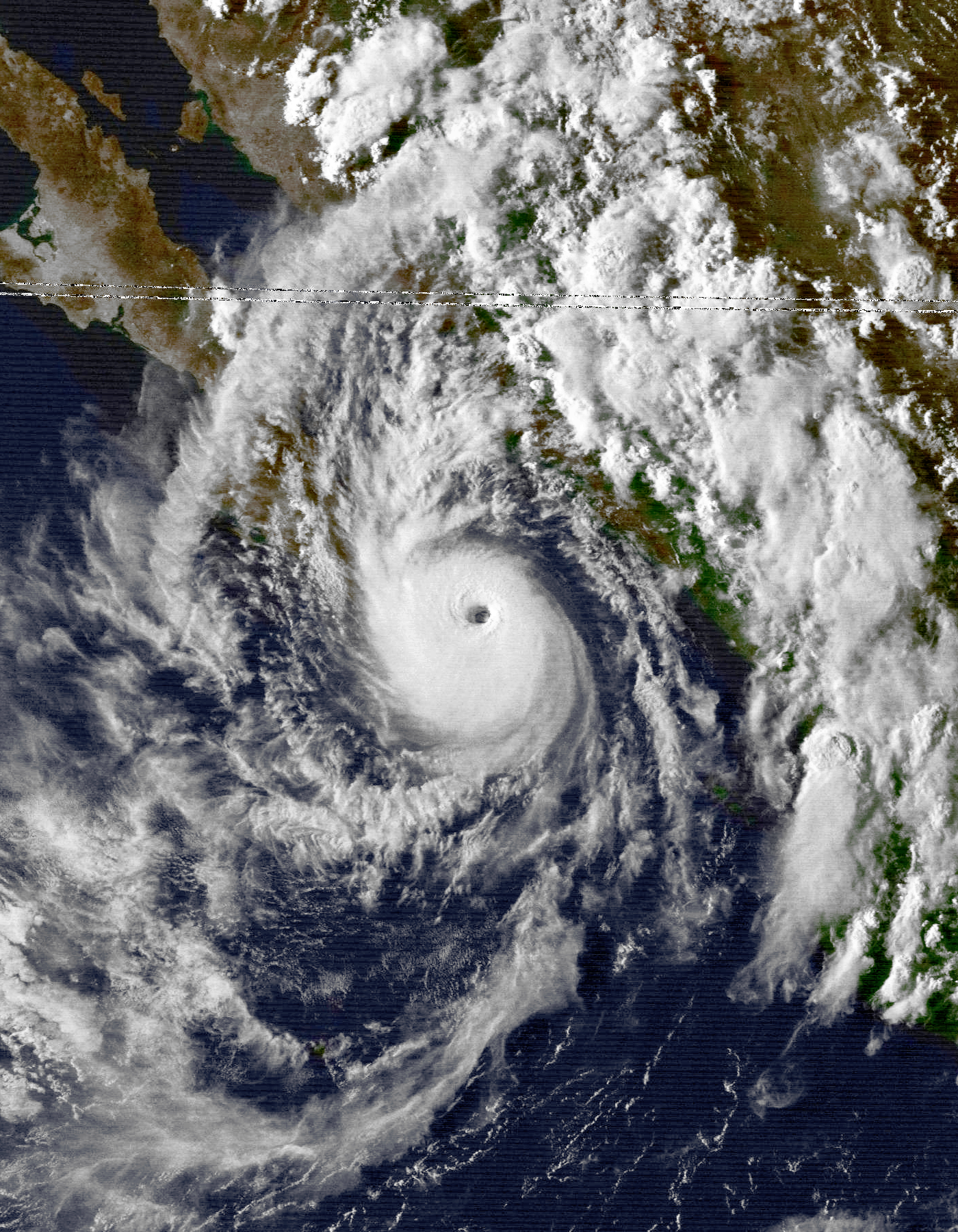
- Hurricane Kiko at peak intensity just south of the Baja Peninsula on August 27

Meteorological history
- Formed: August 25, 1989
- Dissipated: August 29, 1989

Category 3 major hurricane
- 1-minute sustained (SSHWS/NWS)
- Highest winds: 120 mph (195 km/h)
- Lowest pressure: 955 mbar (hPa); 28.20 inHg

Overall effects
- Fatalities: None
- Areas affected: Baja California Sur and Western Mexico
- IBTrACS
- Part of the 1989 Pacific hurricane season

Hurricane Kiko was one of the strongest tropical cyclones on record to have made landfall on Mexico's Baja California peninsula. It was also the earliest major hurricane to strike Mexico's Pacific coast at the time, until it was surpassed by Hurricane Erick in 2025. The eleventh named storm of the 1989 Pacific hurricane season, Kiko formed out of a large mesoscale convective system on August 25. Slowly tracking northwestward, the storm rapidly intensified into a hurricane early the next day. Strengthening continued until early August 27, when Kiko reached its peak intensity with winds of 120 mph (190 km/h). The storm turned west at this time, and at around 0600 UTC, the storm made landfall near Punta Arena, Mexico at the southern tip of Baja California Sur. The hurricane rapidly weakened into a tropical storm later that day and further into a tropical depression by August 28, shortly after entering the Pacific Ocean. The depression persisted for another day while tracking southward, before being absorbed by nearby Tropical Storm Lorena. Though Kiko made landfall as a Category 3 hurricane, its impact was relatively minor. Press reports indicated that 20 homes were destroyed and numerous highways were flooded by torrential rains.

== Meteorological history ==
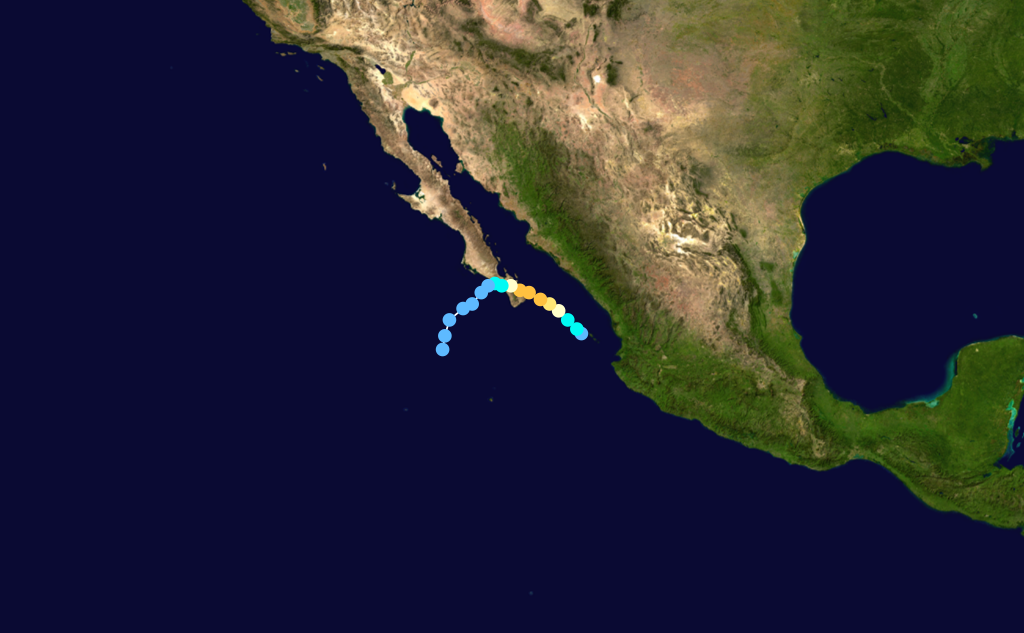
Map plotting the storm's track and intensity, according to the Saffir–Simpson scale Map key Saffir–Simpson scale Tropical depression (≤38 mph, ≤62 km/h) Tropical storm (39–73 mph, 63–118 km/h) Category 1 (74–95 mph, 119–153 km/h) Category 2 (96–110 mph, 154–177 km/h) Category 3 (111–129 mph, 178–208 km/h) Category 4 (130–156 mph, 209–251 km/h) Category 5 (≥157 mph, ≥252 km/h) Unknown Storm type Tropical cyclone Subtropical cyclone Extratropical cyclone, remnant low, tropical disturbance, or monsoon depression

Unlike most other eastern Pacific hurricanes between 1988 and 1990 that began as tropical waves off the western coast of Africa, Hurricane Kiko developed out of a large-scale mesoscale convective system on August 23 on the coast of Sonora. The system slowly tracked southward into the Gulf of California and became increasingly organized. Shower and thunderstorm activity was present around an area of low pressure the following day; however, insufficient reports from the region hindered the National Hurricane Center's (NHC) forecasting ability. By August 25, satellite intensity estimates, using the Dvorak technique, indicated that the low had developed into a tropical depression around 1200 UTC, while the storm was located about 115 miles (185 kilometers) south of Mazatlán, Sinaloa. Operationally, the system was not declared a tropical depression; instead it was immediately declared Tropical Storm Kiko with winds of 40 mph (64 km/h). Located within an area with little or no steering current, and situated over warm waters and underneath an upper-level low, conditions were near perfect for rapid intensification, despite the proximity to land. A general northwestward drift was anticipated, and the NHC forecast the storm to reach hurricane intensity within 24 hours.

Convective banding features began to develop late on August 25 as winds around the center reached 50 mph (80 km/h). With the development of an anticyclone over the storm, Kiko's outflow become more pronounced. Around 0600 UTC on August 26, an eye developed within the small circulation, suggesting the cyclone had strengthened into a Category 1 hurricane on the Saffir–Simpson hurricane wind scale. However, satellite intensity estimates indicated winds of only 40 mph (64 km/h). Shortly after, Kiko was upgraded to a Category 2 hurricane with winds of 100 mph (160 km/h). Ships in the vicinity of the hurricane reported tropical storm-force winds extending roughly 50 mi (80 km) from the center. Winds within the eyewall subsequently increased to 115 mph (185 km/h), making Kiko a minimal Category 3 hurricane. Intensification continued for another six hours, ending around 0000 UTC on August 27, at which time the storm reached its peak intensity with winds of 120 mph (190 km/h) and a minimum pressure of 955 mbar (hPa; 28.2 inHg).

Around the time of peak intensity, Dvorak intensity estimates reached T6.0, equating to a minimal Category 4 hurricane with winds of 135 mph (217 km/h). A trough located to the north of the hurricane began to weaken, causing the storm to track in a more westward direction. Kiko weakened slightly before making landfall near Punta Arena, on the southern tip of Baja California, with winds of 115 mph (185 kph). Kiko was the second major hurricane on record to make landfall on the Gulf Coast of Baja California since reliable recordkeeping began in 1949, the first being Hurricane Olivia in 1967. It also became the earliest major hurricane to make landfall on Mexico's Pacific coast, a record that was later surpassed by Hurricane Erick in 2025. Due to the small size and slow movement of the storm, it rapidly weakened, becoming a tropical storm by 1800 UTC. Convection associated with the storm significantly diminished; the center of circulation became nearly devoid of thunderstorm activity early on August 28. Shortly after emerging into the Pacific Ocean, Kiko was further downgraded into a tropical depression, and turned towards the southwest due to interaction with nearby Tropical Storm Lorena. Tropical Depression Kiko dissipated around 1800 UTC on August 29; however, its remnants continued southward before being absorbed by Lorena.

== Preparations and impact ==
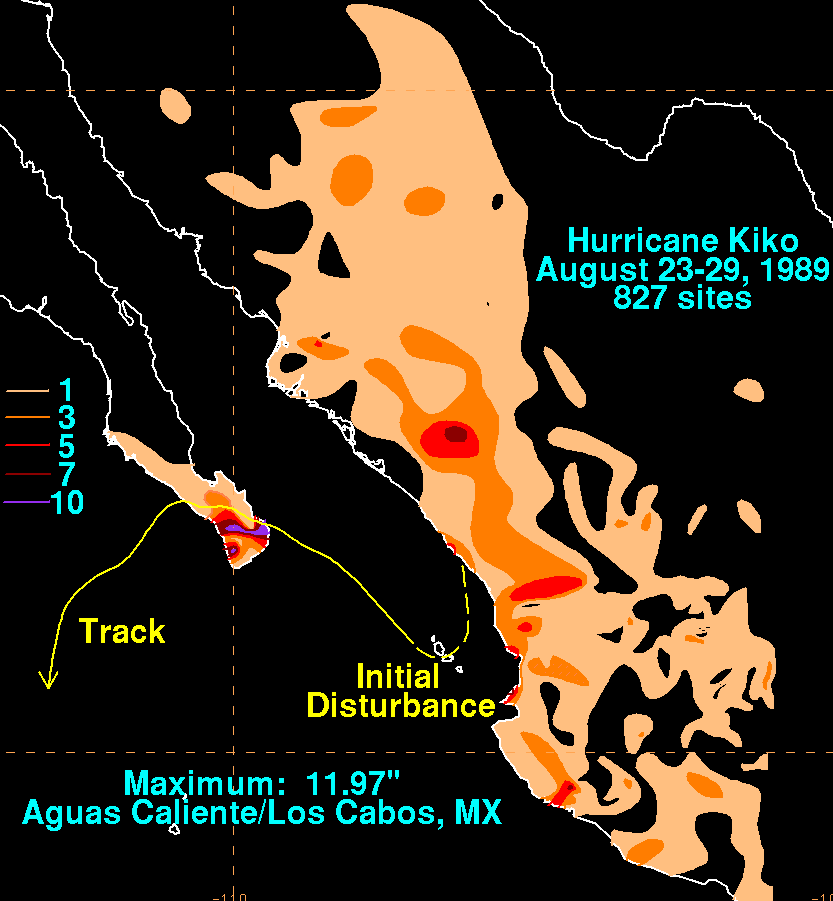
Rainfall totals from Kiko

Around 2100 UTC on August 25, the Government of Mexico issued a hurricane warning for the Islas Marías and areas between the southern border of Sonora and El Dorado. A hurricane watch was also issued for areas between Los Burros, Mexico and the southern tip of Baja California Sur along the Gulf of California. By 0900 UTC the following day, the hurricane watch was upgraded to a warning. Roughly three hours later, the previous hurricane watch issued for Sonora was discontinued as Kiko was no longer forecast to make landfall in the state. The hurricane warning on Baja California was also extended northward to Bahía Concepción. Due to uncertainty in Kiko's track, a hurricane watch was re-issued for Sonora between El Dorado and Los Mochis. Around 0900 UTC on August 27, a hurricane warning was issued for areas south of San Carlos on the Pacific coast of Baja California. The hurricane watch for Sonora was then discontinued. By 1800 UTC, the hurricane warnings on the Gulf Coast of Baja California were replaced by a tropical storm warning which was declared for areas between the southern tip of the peninsula and Bahía Concepción. At this time, the hurricane warning for the Pacific coast was revised to a tropical storm warning. Early on August 28, all watches and warnings were discontinued as Kiko weakened into a tropical depression and moved away from land.

In Baja California Sur, more than 1,300 people evacuated to shelters in La Paz. Flights arriving and departing in the region were canceled or diverted to other airports. The Red Cross prepared shelters in schools, hospitals, and other public buildings throughout the city. On the Islas Marías, an unconfirmed report of 54 mph (87 km/h) sustained winds was relayed to the National Hurricane Center. Due to the hurricane's small size, only areas directly in the path of the storm received precipitation; however, a monsoonal outer band on the eastern side of the storm produced widespread rainfall in eastern Mexico. In Sonora, over 7 in (180 mm) of rain fell in mountainous areas, while numerous locations recorded at least 1 in (25 mm). In Baja California, the heaviest rainfall was recorded in Los Cabos, and amounted to 11.97 in (304 mm). Only a small portion of the peninsula received more than 10 in (250 mm) of rain. At least 1,000 people were evacuated from heavily damaged areas. Press reports indicated that 20 homes were destroyed by Hurricane Kiko. High winds, gusting over 109 mph (175 km/h), brought down numerous trees and power lines.

Before Kiko's eye moved ashore, the airport near Cabo San Lucas reported sustained winds of 47 mph (76 km/h) with gusts up to 63 mph (101 km/h). Meteorological recordings near the place of landfall were not available as the small system tracked over a sparsely populated region. From La Paz to Cabo San Lucas, power and water supplies were lost. The heavy rains flooded several highways, and the resultant flood waters overturned a bus. Passengers on the bus managed to escape injury and were quickly brought to shelter by the local fire department. The storm's effects washed out roughly 100 yd (91 m) of the San Antonio–San Bartolome highway. The Rancho Leonero Resort in Buena Vista sustained severe roof damage and several docked boats were damaged. Several days after Kiko dissipated, remnant moisture from the storm contributed to a complex weather system that produced torrential rainfall throughout the U.S. state of Kansas, unofficially reaching 16 in (410 mm) in localized areas.

== See also ==
- Other storms of the same name
- Hurricane Olaf (2021)
