= Hurricane Olaf (2021) =

Category 2 Pacific hurricane in 2021

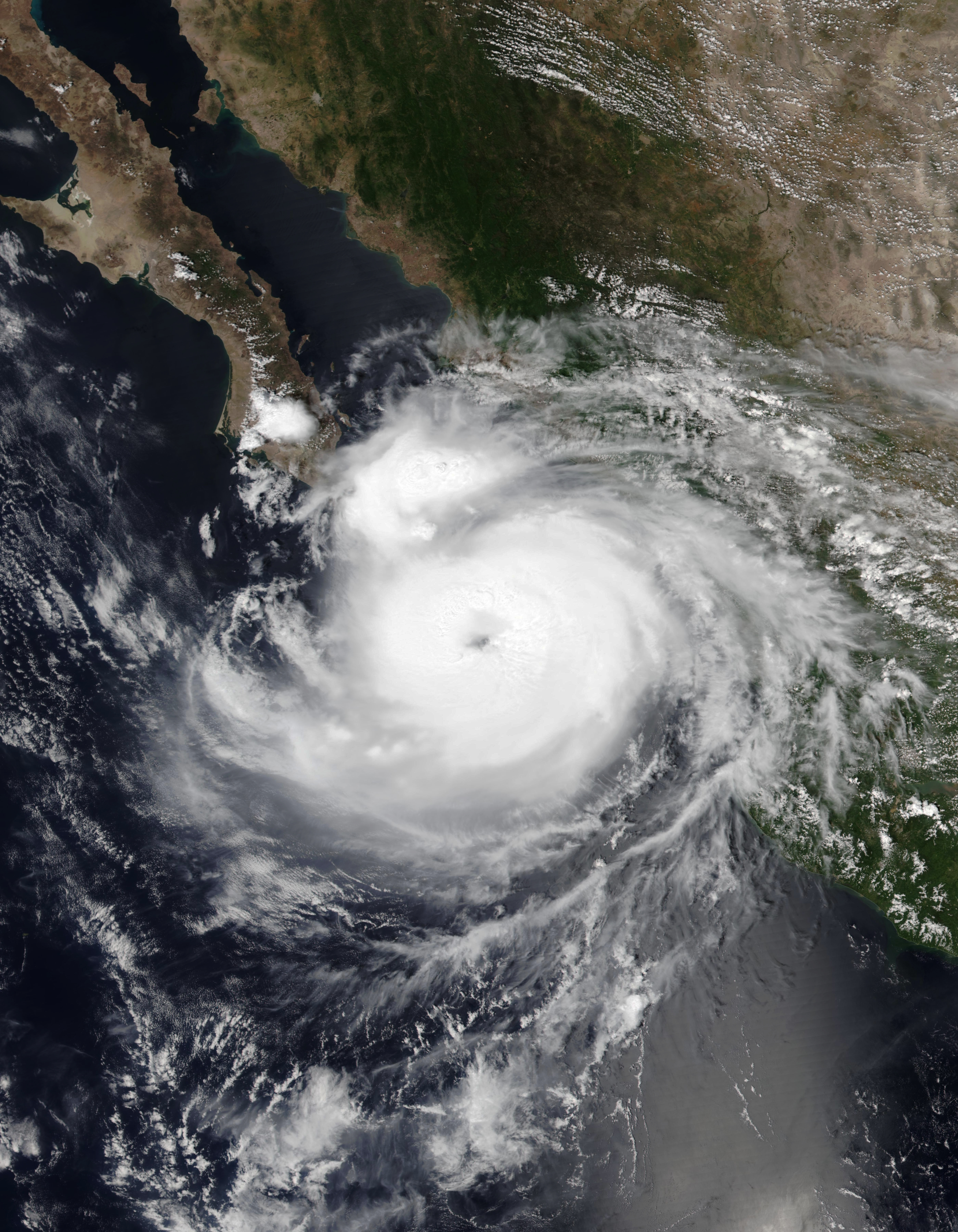
- Hurricane Olaf nearing peak intensity as it approaches Baja California Sur on September 9, 2021.

Meteorological history
- Formed: September 7, 2021
- Remnant low: September 11, 2021
- Dissipated: September 12, 2021

Category 2 hurricane
- 1-minute sustained (SSHWS/NWS)
- Highest winds: 105 mph (165 km/h)
- Lowest pressure: 975 mbar (hPa); 28.79 inHg

Overall effects
- Fatalities: 1 total
- Damage: $18.8 million (2021 USD)
- Areas affected: Western Mexico, Baja California Sur
- IBTrACS /
- Part of the 2021 Pacific hurricane season

Hurricane Olaf was a Category 2 Pacific hurricane that struck the Baja California Peninsula in September 2021. The fifteenth named storm and sixth hurricane of the 2021 Pacific hurricane season, the cyclone formed from an area of low pressure that developed off the southwestern coast of Mexico on September 5, 2021. The disturbance developed within a favorable environment, acquiring more convection and a closed surface circulation. The disturbance developed into Tropical Depression Fifteen-E by 18:00 UTC (Note: All times are in Coordinated Universal Time, unless otherwise noted) on September 7. The depression strengthened into a tropical storm and was named Olaf at 12:00 UTC the next day. Olaf quickly strengthened as it moved to the north-northwest, and was upgraded to a hurricane 24 hours after being named. Hurricane Olaf continued to intensify and reached peak intensity while its center was just offshore the southwestern coast of Baja California Sur, with maximum sustained winds of 105 mph (169 km/h) and a minimum barometric pressure of 975 mbar (28.8 inHg). Just after reaching peak intensity, the hurricane made landfall near San José del Cabo. Interaction with the mountainous terrain of the Baja California Peninsula caused Olaf to quickly weaken. It was downgraded to a tropical storm at 12:00 UTC on September 10. The system became devoid of convection later that day and degenerated to a remnant low by 06:00 UTC on September 11.

The precursor disturbance to Olaf caused flooding in the southwestern Mexican states of Jalisco and Colima. The storm triggered school, port, and COVID-19 vaccination-site closures in Baja California Sur as it approached the peninsula. Severe rainfall, flooding, mudslides, uprooted trees and damage to power lines and hotels affected the state as the hurricane made landfall and moved over the peninsula. Total damage from Olaf was calculated at 381 million pesos (US$18.8 million), (Note: All currencies are in their 2021 values and are converted to United States dollars using data from the International Monetary Fund published by the World Bank.) and one person died due to a mudslide produced by the storm in Jalisco.

== Meteorological history ==
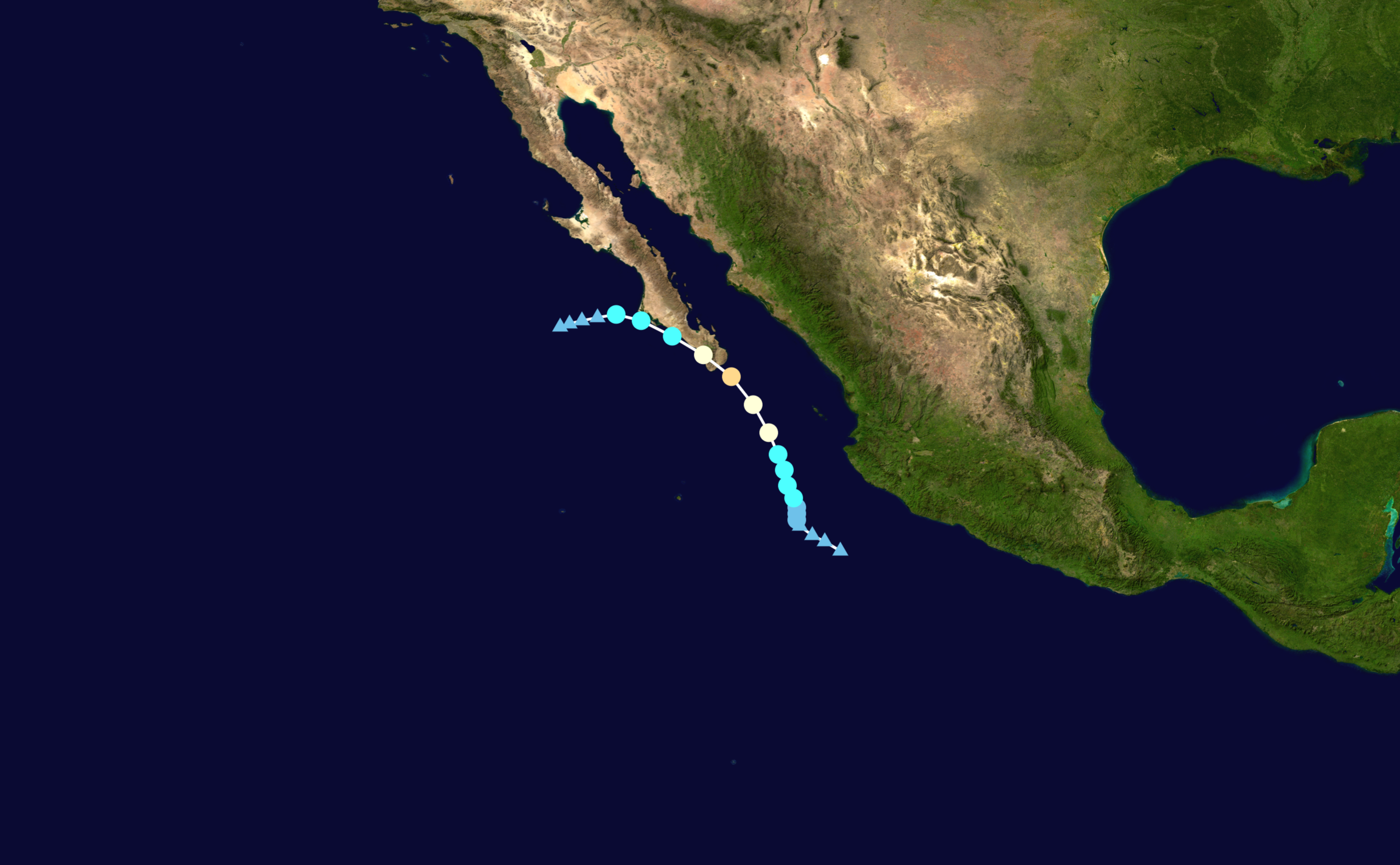
Map plotting the storm's track and intensity, according to the Saffir–Simpson scale Map key Saffir–Simpson scale Tropical depression (≤38 mph, ≤62 km/h) Tropical storm (39–73 mph, 63–118 km/h) Category 1 (74–95 mph, 119–153 km/h) Category 2 (96–110 mph, 154–177 km/h) Category 3 (111–129 mph, 178–208 km/h) Category 4 (130–156 mph, 209–251 km/h) Category 5 (≥157 mph, ≥252 km/h) Unknown Storm type Tropical cyclone Subtropical cyclone Extratropical cyclone, remnant low, tropical disturbance, or monsoon depression

A tropical wave emerged off the northwestern coast of Africa on August 22, 2021, and moved westward across the Atlantic Ocean. The wave fractured over the central Atlantic on August 27, with the northern portion developing into Tropical Storm Kate the following day. The southern portion of the wave continued westward, crossing Central America on September 1, at which time the wave fractured again, with a portion of its northern low-level vorticity center splitting off into the Gulf of Mexico and developing into Tropical Storm Mindy. The parent wave continued into the Eastern Pacific on September 2, and produced disorganized convective activity as it progressed to the south of the Pacific Coast of Mexico, leading to the formation of an area of low pressure on September 5. The low gradually developed a well-defined center and organized convection, leading to the formation of Tropical Depression Fifteen-E by 12:00 UTC on September 7.

Tropical Depression Fifteen-E shortly after formation, on September 8.

The depression's inner-core convection was disheveled for a while after formation, but the cyclone organized and became better defined throughout September 8, as it drifted northward within weak steering currents. At 12:00 UTC on the same day, the cyclone strengthened into a tropical storm and was given the name Olaf. Turning northwestward at a slow pace, Olaf developed banding features and good outflow within very favorable environmental conditions for intensification, featuring warm sea-surface temperatures (SSTs) and low amounts of vertical wind shear. On September 9, the storm developed a well-defined eye and rapidly intensified into a Category 1 hurricane around 12:00 UTC. Olaf intensified at an even quicker rate as it neared to southwestern coast of the Baja California Peninsula, developing a symmetrical eyewall as its winds increased by 20 mph in just six hours. At 02:50 UTC on September 10, Olaf reached peak intensity with maximum sustained winds of 105 mph (169 km/h) and a minimum barometric pressure of 968 millibars (28.6 inHg); the storm made landfall very near San José del Cabo at this time.

Olaf's center briefly crossed Baja California Sur before re-emerging back over water, weakening back to Category 1 status in the process. Shortly after emerging back over water, the organization of Olaf collapsed, including its eye and eyewall, and it was downgraded to a tropical storm by 12:00 UTC. Gradually moving westward away from land, Olaf continued to rapidly weaken, with its low-level center becoming exposed and devoid of any deep convection by 21:00 UTC. By 06:00 UTC on September 11, Olaf had been devoid of any organized deep convection for 12 hours, and was therefore designated a remnant low as it turned back to the southwest. The low continued westward for another day before degenerating into a trough of low pressure on September 12.

== Preparations and impact ==
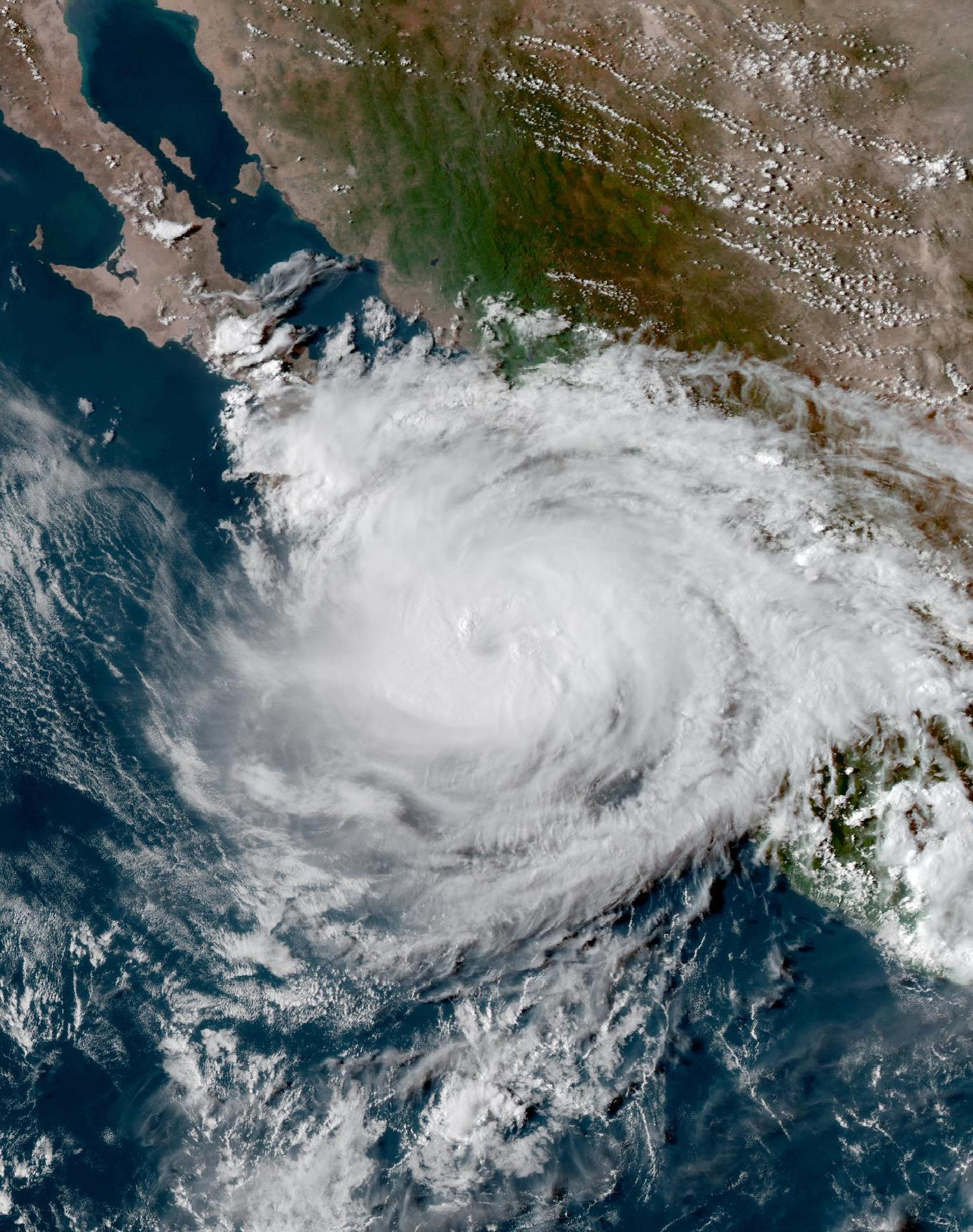
Hurricane Olaf intensifying near the Baja California Peninsula on September 9.

At 03:00 UTC on September 8, tropical storm watches were issued for southern portions of Baja California Sur. These were extended northward at 09:00 UTC before tropical storm warnings were issued for the same areas. These remained until 09:00 UTC on September 9, when hurricane warnings were issued and tropical storm warnings were extended northward. Hurricane and tropical storm warnings were once again extended northward twelve hours later at 21:00 UTC, six hours before landfall. A red alert was issued statewide. Up to 6 in (150 mm) of rainfall was anticipated for the states of Baja California Sur, Sinaloa, and Nayarit as Olaf approached, along with potential surf of up to 23 ft (7.0 m). Before landfall, ports and schools were closed and residents living in flood zones were urged to evacuate. COVID-19 vaccinations were suspended and 20,000 tourists fled to hotels. 20 temporary shelters were set up in Baja California Sur for residents with homes in high-risk areas of impact. Classes in Cabo San Lucas were suspended on September 10.

The Federal Electricity Commission (CFE) of Mexico reported that over 191,000 people lost electricity at the height of the storm. By September 12, with the help of 678 electrical workers, 110 cranes, 212 vehicles and 2 helicopters, power had been restored to 94% of the affected population. Moisture associated with Olaf resulted in heavy rains and flash flooding across the state of Jalisco, causing the collapse of a trailer near Mexican Federal Highway 80 and an associated fatality. Heavy rains from both Olaf and Hurricane Nora, which affected northwestern Mexico less than two weeks prior, prompted the closure of beaches across the neighboring state of Nayarit. Heavy rain, strong winds, and high waves buffeted the southwest coast of the Baja California Peninsula. Olaf brought powerful winds and heavy rainfall to Baja California Sur. Hotels in the state received minor damage, and some motorists were trapped in their vehicles; numerous fallen trees were also reported. A total of thirty-seven airline flights were cancelled due to the hurricane. Damages in Baja California Sur valued at 381 million pesos (US$18.8 million).

== See also ==
- Weather of 2021
- Tropical cyclones in 2021
- List of Category 2 Pacific hurricanes
- Other tropical cyclones named Olaf
- Hurricane Kiko (1989) – Had a similar track and impacted similar areas
- Hurricane Henriette (1995) – Had a similar track and peak intensity
- Hurricane Ignacio (2003) – Took a similar track, had a similar peak intensity and effects
- Hurricane Marty (2003) – Impacted similar areas and had a similar peak intensity
