= List of storms named Olaf =

The name Olaf has been used for six tropical cyclones in the Eastern Pacific.

The name is used on the modern six-year lists:

- Hurricane Olaf (1985), Category 1 hurricane that never threatened land.
- Tropical Storm Olaf (1997), long-lived and erratic tropical storm that made landfall twice.
- Hurricane Olaf (2003), Category 1 hurricane made landfall in Mexico as a tropical storm.
- Tropical Storm Olaf (2009), short-lived tropical storm that approached Baja California.
- Hurricane Olaf (2015), Category 4 hurricane that moved into the Central Pacific and then back into the Eastern Pacific while still tropical.
- Hurricane Olaf (2021), Category 2 hurricane that made landfall in Baja California.

The name Olaf was also used for one tropical cyclone in the Southwest Pacific:

- Cyclone Olaf (2005), a Category 5 cyclone that affected Samoa.
