= Santo Domingo Armenta =

- Municipality and town
- Location in Mexico
- Coordinates: 16°19′N 98°22′W
- Country: Mexico
- State: Oaxaca
- Time zone: UTC-6 (Central Standard Time)

Santo Domingo Armenta is a town and municipality in Oaxaca in south-western Mexico. The municipality covers an area of km^{2}. It is located in the Jamiltepec District in the west of the Costa Region.

As of 2005, the municipality had a total population of .
