= Montalvo =

Montalvo may refer to:

== Places ==
=== California ===
- Montalvo Arts Center (Villa Montalvo), a non-profit center in Saratoga, California, United States
- West Montalvo Oil Field, near Oxnard, California, US
- Montalvo, Ventura, California, a former village in Ventura County, California, founded in 1887, now part of the city of Ventura, California
- East Ventura (Metrolink station) (formerly known as "Montalvo"), a Metrolink rail station in the city of Ventura, California, US

=== Elsewhere ===
- Montalvo (Constância), a parish in the municipality of Constância, Portugal
- Montalvo, Ecuador‘, the capital of Montalvo Canton, Los Ríos Province, Ecuador

== People ==
- Abelardo Montalvo (1876–1950), President of Ecuador from October 1933-September 1934
- Agustin de Hinojosa y Montalvo, O.F.M. (1575–1631), Spanish Roman Catholic Bishop of Nicaragua (1630–1631)
- Alonso Díaz de Montalvo (1405–1499), Spanish jurist
- Bartolomé Montalvo (1769–1846), a Spanish painter
- Benito Montalvo (born 1985), Argentine footballer
- Carlos Montalvo, Cuban sprint canoer
- Drew G. Montalvo, American-born DJ and music producer
- Edilberto Jesús Buenfil Montalvo (born 1938), Mexican politician from the IRP
- Eleonora Ramirez di Montalvo (1602–1659), Italian educator, author, and poet
- Eric Montalvo, American lawyer
- Felix Montalvo, athlete in the 2010 Central American and Caribbean Junior Championships
- Francisco José Montalvo y Ambulodi Arriola y Casabant Valdespino (1754–1822), Spanish soldier, colonial administrator and politician
- Gabriel Montalvo Higuera (1930–2006), Roman Catholic archbishop and Vatican nuncio to the United States
- Garci Rodríguez de Montalvo (c. 1450–1505), a Spanish writer who coined the name "California"
- Genie Montalvo (born 1951), Puerto Rican actress, director, producer and author
- Gregorio de Montalvo Olivera, O.P. (1529–1592), Roman Catholic Bishop of Cuzco (1587–1592) and then Bishop of Yucatán
- Jeff Montalvo (born 1987), an American music producer
- José Montalvo (choreographer) (born 1954), French dancer and choreographer
- José Leandro Montalvo Guenard (1885–1950), Puerto Rican physician, inventor, anthropologist and historian
- José Luis Montalvo (1946–1994), Chicano writer, poet, and community activist
- José Luis Montalvo (1946–1994), a Chicano writer, poet, and community activist
- José Montalvo (choreographer), a French choreographer
- José Ramón Hinojosa Montalvo (born 1947), Spanish historian and Professor of Medieval History at the University of Alicante
- Juan Bustillos Montalvo (born 1955), Mexican politician affiliated with the Institutional Revolutionary Party
- Juan Jiménez de Montalvo (1551–?), interim viceroy of Peru from 1621 to 1622
- Juan Montalvo (1832–1889), a famous Ecuadorian author and essayist
- Juan Montalvo (bishop), O.P. or Juan de Montalvo (died 1586), Roman Catholic Bishop of Cartagena (1578–1586)
- Jesús Manuel Patrón Montalvo (born 1957), Mexican politician from the Institutional Revolutionary Party
- Laura Montalvo (born 1976), Argentine former professional female tennis player
- Maria de las Mercedes Santa Cruz y Montalvo (1789–1852), Cuban author
- Miguel Montalvo (born 1943), Cuban basketball player
- Niurka Montalvo (born 1968), Spanish athlete
- Óscar Montalvo Finetti (born 1937), Peruvian former football player
- Paco Montalvo (born 1992), Spanish classical musician and creator of flamenco violin as the main voice
- Pedro Montalvo Gómez (born 1968), Mexican politician from the Institutional Revolutionary Party
- Rafael Montalvo (baseball) (born 1964), a Major League Baseball pitcher
- Ramón Montalvo Hernández (born 1974), Mexican politician affiliated with the PRD
- Victorio Montalvo Rojas (born 1966), Mexican lawyer and politician affiliated with the PDR
- Yolanda del Carmen Montalvo López (born 1960), Mexican politician from the National Action Party
- Yuvanna Montalvo (born 1988), Venezuelan model and actress
