= Juan Bustillos Montalvo =

Mexican politician

- Born: 9 June 1955 (age 71); Temapache, Veracruz, Mexico
- Education: Universidad Tecnológica de México
- Occupation: Politician
- Political party: PRI

Juan Bustillos Montalvo (Note: In this Spanish name, the first or paternal surname is Bustillos and the second or maternal family name is Montalvo.) (born 9 June 1955) is a Mexican farmer and politician affiliated with the Institutional Revolutionary Party (PRI).

Bustillos Montalvo was born in the municipality of Álamo Temapache, Veracruz, in 1955 and holds a degree in economics from the Technological University of Mexico (UNITEC).

In 1991 he was elected to the Chamber of Deputies to represent Veracruz's 18th district during the 55th Congress (1991–1994).

From 2000 to 2003 he served as the municipal president of Álamo Temapache and, during his term in office, commissioned the construction of the El Colotero monument along Federal Highway 127 at the entrance to the city of Álamo.

In the 2003 mid-terms he was re-elected to Congress to represent Veracruz's 4th district during the 59th Congress (2003–2006).
