= Hurricane Raymond (1989) =

Category 4 Pacific hurricane in 1989

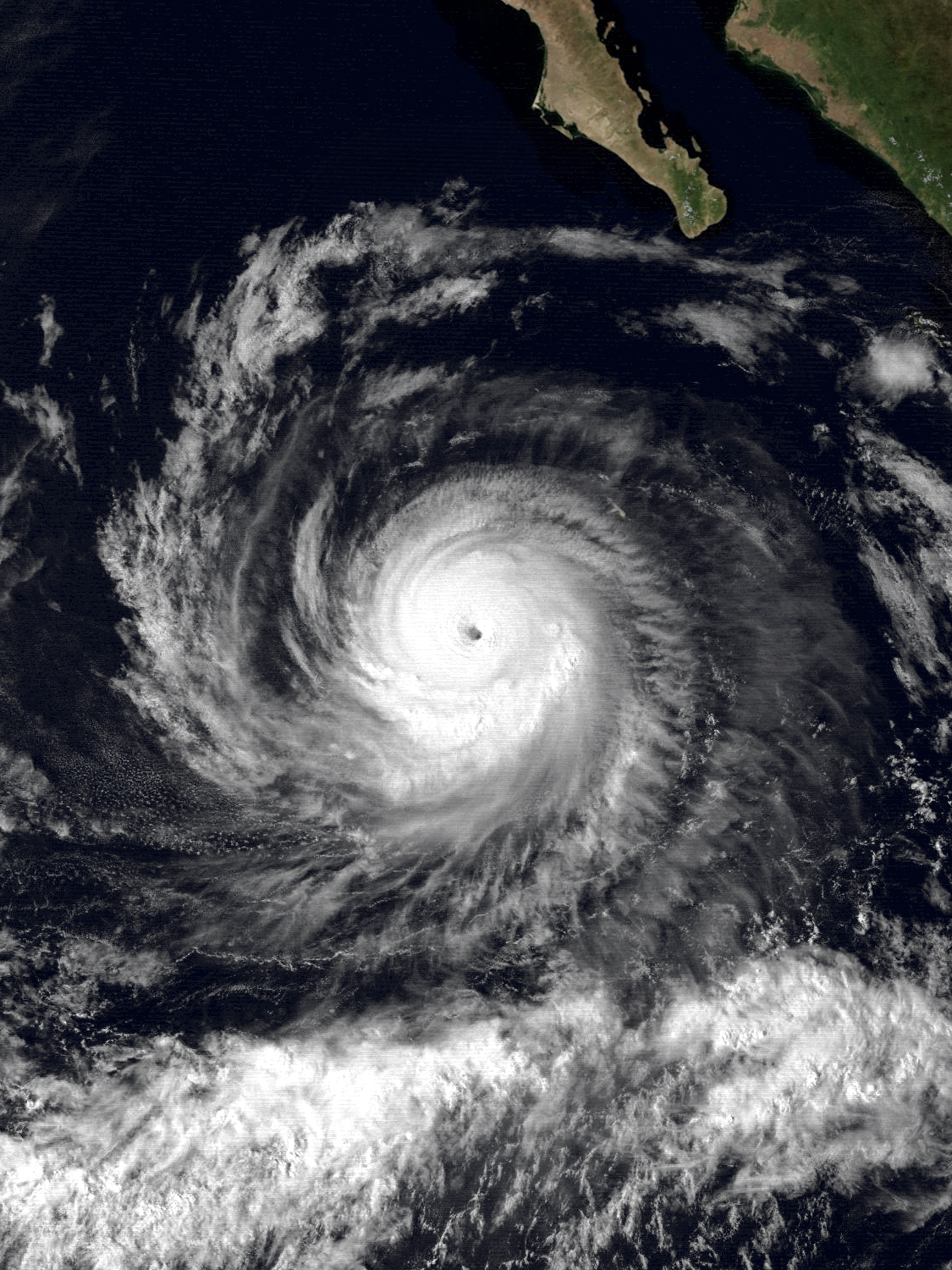
- Hurricane Raymond near peak intensity on September 30

Meteorological history
- Formed: September 25, 1989
- Dissipated: October 5, 1989

Category 4 major hurricane
- 1-minute sustained (SSHWS/NWS)
- Highest winds: 145 mph (230 km/h)
- Lowest pressure: 935 mbar (hPa); 27.61 inHg

Overall effects
- Fatalities: 1 direct
- Damage: $1.75 million (1989 USD)
- Areas affected: Baja California Peninsula, Sonora, Chihuahua, Arizona, Texas, Oklahoma, Kansas, and Missouri
- IBTrACS
- Part of the 1989 Pacific hurricane season

Hurricane Raymond was the strongest tropical cyclone of the 1989 Pacific hurricane season, peaking as a strong Category 4 hurricane on the Saffir–Simpson hurricane scale. Forming out of a tropical wave on September 25, 1989, the tropical depression slowly tracked northwest before becoming nearly stationary the next day. Shortly after, the depression intensified into Tropical Storm Raymond and took a general westward track. Gradually intensifying, Raymond attained hurricane-status on September 28 and attained its peak intensity on September 30, with winds of 145 mph (233 km/h) and a barometric pressure of 935 mbar (hPa; 27.61 inHg). Steady weakening then took place and by October 3, Raymond turned northeast towards land. The storm continued to weaken as it accelerated and eventually made landfall on the Baja California Peninsula as a tropical storm late on October 4 and a second landfall in Sonora, Mexico. Shortly after, Raymond weakened to a depression as it tracked inland. The remnants of the system persisted until October 7 when it dissipated over the Central United States.

Due to the rapid motion of the storm, little impact was felt in Mexico. Moderate rain fell in association with Raymond, peaking at 4.72 in (120 mm) in Nogales. There, flooding destroyed a bridge and nearby store, leaving $250,000 in damage. The remnants of Raymond produced more significant damage in the United States. Tucson, Arizona recorded 4.5 in (110 mm) of rain from the storm, resulting in flash flooding that reached a depth of 2 ft (0.61 m) in some places. In nearby Willcox, flood waters inundated roughly 75% of the city. High winds from the storm also resulted in one fatality after a mobile home was destroyed. In all, damage throughout Arizona amounted to $1.5 million.

== Meteorological history ==
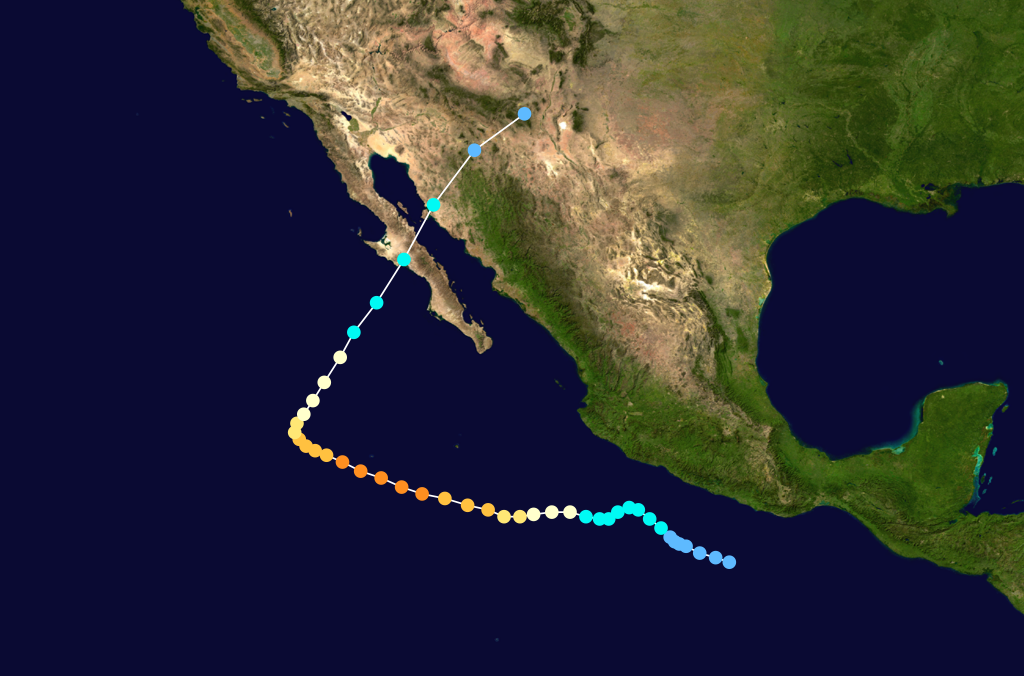
Map plotting the storm's track and intensity, according to the Saffir–Simpson scale Map key Saffir–Simpson scale Tropical depression (≤38 mph, ≤62 km/h) Tropical storm (39–73 mph, 63–118 km/h) Category 1 (74–95 mph, 119–153 km/h) Category 2 (96–110 mph, 154–177 km/h) Category 3 (111–129 mph, 178–208 km/h) Category 4 (130–156 mph, 209–251 km/h) Category 5 (≥157 mph, ≥252 km/h) Unknown Storm type Tropical cyclone Subtropical cyclone Extratropical cyclone, remnant low, tropical disturbance, or monsoon depression

Hurricane Raymond originated out of a tropical wave that also spawned Hurricane Hugo in early September. With little convective development, the wave tracked westward across the Atlantic Ocean, entering the Caribbean several days later. By September 22, shower and thunderstorm activity increased as it crossed Central America and entered the eastern Pacific basin. By September 24, the wave had become sufficiently organized for the Dvorak Technique to be implemented on the system. The National Hurricane Center (NHC) estimated that the wave spawned Tropical Depression Twenty One-E about 200 miles (320 km) south of Acapulco, Mexico, on September 25. Operationally, the NHC did not begin issuing advisories on the depression until September 26; at that time, the system's outflow developed and the depression was nearly stationary as a mid-level low over Mexico moved south. Shortly after, the depression was upgraded to a tropical storm and given the name Raymond by the NHC.

Raymond maintained a small area of deep convection around the center of circulation; however, outflow gradually became restricted due to the upper-level trough over Mexico. Southerly wind shear around the storm began to increase late on September 27 in response to a cutoff low developing over southern Texas and northern Mexico; this led to a decrease in shower and thunderstorm activity with the system, preventing intensification. By this time, the storm had resumed a general westward track. The following day, the storm intensified into a hurricane, the ninth and final of the season, after an eye developed. Throughout September 29, the eye became more defined on satellite imagery, indicating intensification. Later that day, Raymond strengthened into a Category 4 hurricane. Early on October 1, Raymond reached its peak intensity with winds of 145 mph (233 km/h) and a barometric pressure of 935 mbar (hPa; 27.61 inHg). Shortly after, the eye increased in size but became less symmetrical, indicating that the storm was beginning to weaken.

By October 2, convection surrounding the eye warmed and Raymond was downgraded to a Category 3 hurricane as it began to slow in a weak steering environment. Early the next day, the now Category 2 hurricane turned northeast and quickly accelerated in response to an approaching long-wave trough. Later on October 3, the cyclone further weakened to a Category 1 storm as an eye was no longer present in the circulation. Increasing wind shear and decreasing water temperatures sped up the rate of weakening as Raymond approached the Baja California Peninsula. Around 2300 UTC on October 4, the center of the storm made landfall in the municipality of Ensenada in Mexican state of Baja California with winds of 50 mph (80 km/h). After briefly crossing the Gulf of California, the storm made its second and final landfall in the state of Sonora with winds of 40 mph (64 km/h). Shortly after moving inland, Raymond weakened to a tropical depression and quickly transitioned into an extratropical cyclone over Arizona in the Southwest United States. The upper-level remnants of the hurricane persisted until October 7 over the Midwest region.

== Preparations and impact ==
=== Mexico ===
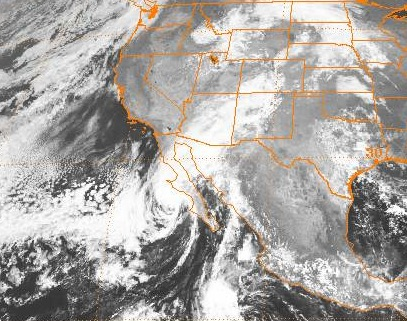
Tropical Storm Raymond several hours prior to Baja California Peninsula landfall

Around 0300 UTC on October 4, the Government of Mexico issued a tropical storm warning for areas between Punta Abreojos and San Carlos on the Pacific coast of Baja California and for areas between Santa Rosalía to Loreto on the Gulf coast of the Peninsula. Roughly twelve hours later, the warning was superseded by another tropical storm warning. The new warning was issued for areas between Punta Abreojos and El Rosario on the Pacific coast and for areas between Santa Rosalia and Punta Final on the Gulf coast. In mainland Mexico, a tropical storm watch was issued for coastal areas of Sonora between Cabo Lobos and Puerto Penasco. By 1830 UTC, all of the watches and warnings were revised; on the Pacific coast of Baja California, the warning was in effect for areas between Punta Abreojos and San Juanico; on the Gulf coast, the warning was in effect for areas between Santa Rosalia and Punta Conception; the watch for coastal areas of Sonora was upgraded to a tropical storm warning for areas between Guaymas and Cabo Lobos. Following Raymond's landfall in mainland Mexico, all warnings were discontinued by 1200 UTC on October 5.

Since Raymond had significantly weakened prior to its first landfall, only minor impacts were recorded in Mexico. The fast forward speed of the storm limited the amount of rain in the Baja California Peninsula, with only a small area receiving more than 3 in (76 mm). The highest rainfall was recorded in Nogales at 4.72 in (120 mm). In the city, the swollen Santa Cruz River destroyed a heavily traveled bridge, known as the Calle Obregon, and a store which was situated on the banks of the river. Mexican officials estimated damages in Nogales at $250,000.

=== United States ===
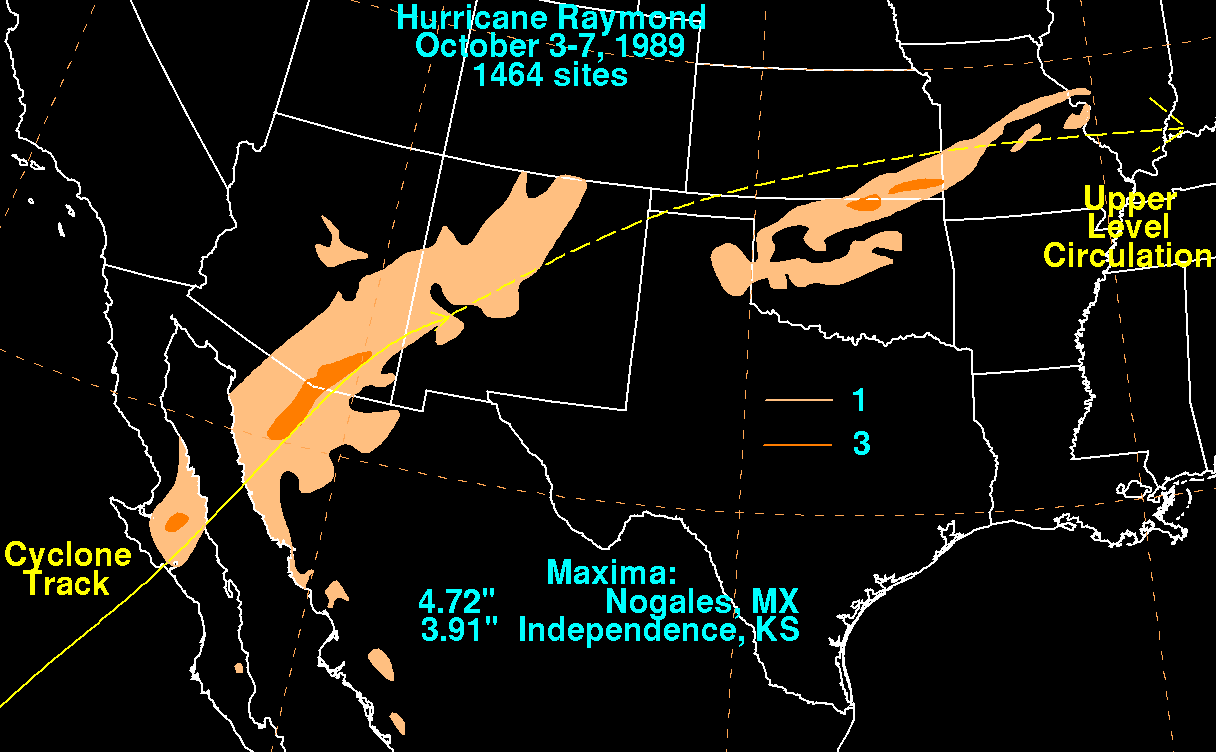
Rainfall totals from Hurricane Raymond

The day prior to Raymond's impacts in the United States, weather forecasts in Arizona indicated that heavy rainfall associated with the remnants of the storm were likely to trigger flash flooding and landslides, with rainfall rates reaching 0.5 in/h (12.5 mm/h). Flash flood watches were issued for parts of southern Arizona as well as mountainous and northern parts of New Mexico between October 5 and 6. Rainfall in excess of 3 in (76 mm) fell in parts of southern Arizona; with the highest in the state recorded near Tucson at 4.5 in (110 mm). Several locations recorded wind gusts up to 35 mph (56 km/h); however, mountaintops possibly received winds in excess of 40 mph (64 km/h). The highest total in the United States was recorded in Independence, Kansas at 3.91 in (99 mm).

Fifteen streets in the city of Tucson were closed as floodwaters reached 2 ft (0.61 m) in the worst hit areas. The Tucson Electric Power Company reported that parts of the city were without power for eight hours on October 5 due to the storm. The hardest hit area was Willcox; roughly 75% of the city was under 2 ft (0.61 m) of floodwaters. Runoff, mixed with sewage, contaminated a wastewater-treatment plant; cleanup took several days before the plant was operational. Several businesses were flooded, with the Wilcox Auction Barn and the Wapco Apple Packing Plant both containing about 1 ft (0.30 m) of water. The Sulphur Springs Valley Electric Company shut off power to flooded areas as a safety precaution. In Fort Huachuca, power lines were downed, leading to early dismissal of army classes. One person was killed in relation to Raymond after being trapped in a mobile home which was destroyed by high winds. Flash flooding triggered by Raymond caused an estimated $1.5 million in damage throughout Arizona.

== See also ==
- List of Arizona hurricanes
- List of Baja California Peninsula hurricanes
- Other storms of the same name
- List of Category 4 Pacific hurricanes
- Hurricane Sergio (2018) – took a similar track
