= Paco Montalvo =

Spanish classical musician

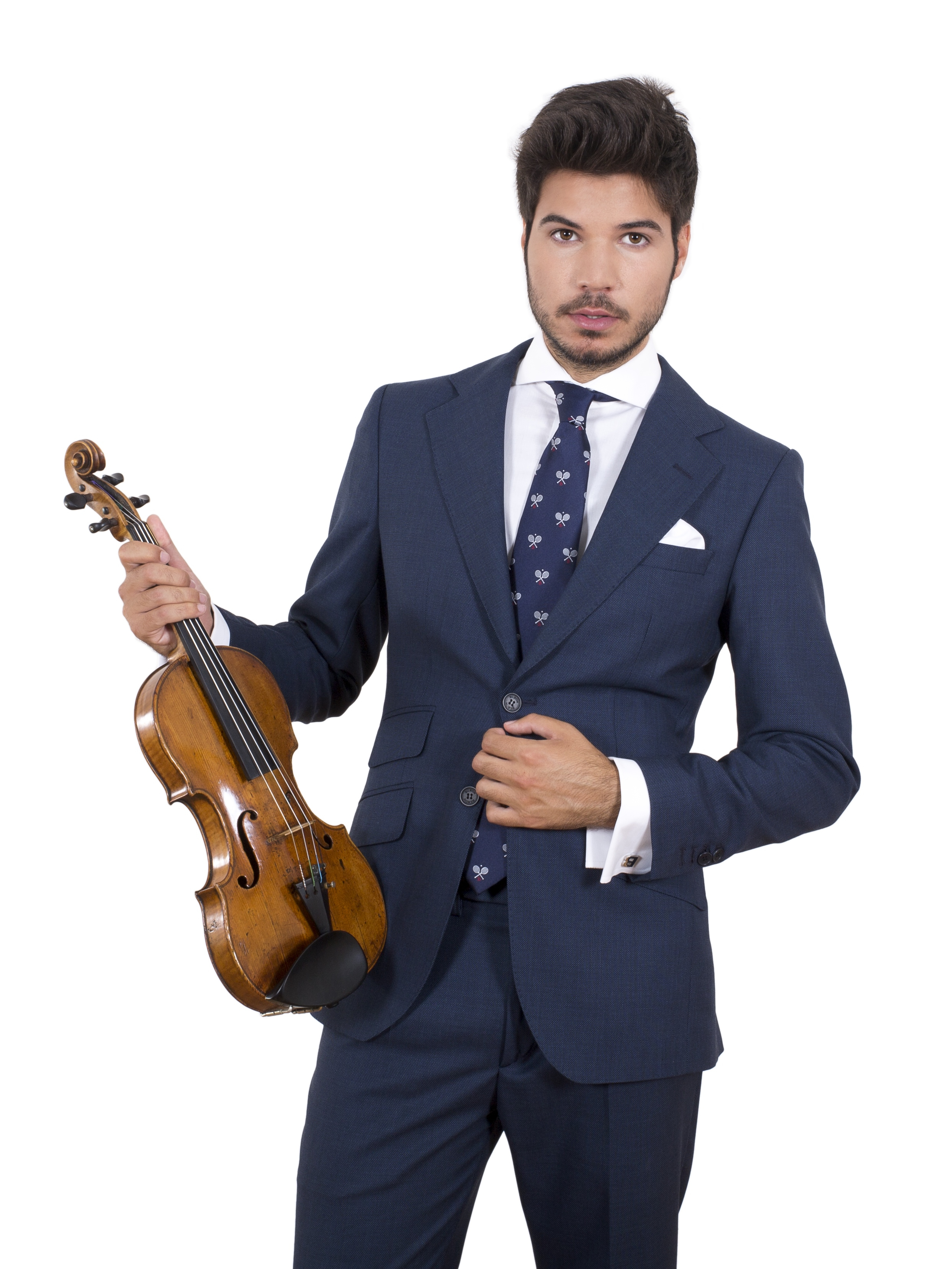

Background information
- Birth name: Francisco Jose Montalvo
- Born: 19 November 1992 (age 32)
- Origin: Córdoba, Spain
- Genres: classical; Flamenco
- Occupation: Violinist
- Instruments: violin
- Website: www.pacomontalvo.org

Paco Montalvo (born 19 November 1992) is a Spanish classical musician and creator of flamenco violin as the main voice. He is the youngest violinist to make a 21st-century debut in the main hall of Carnegie Hall in New York City.

== Biography ==
Paco Montalvo's interest in music began when he was quite young. His family introduced him to the violin at an early age. He began by taking lessons from his father at the age of five. Since then, he has studied with Yuri Petrossian and Nestor Eidler, who was a disciple of Szentgÿorgyi and David Oistrakh. He gave his first recital at the age of six. When he was twelve years old, he made his debut with the Spanish Radio and Television Symphony Orchestra in Madrid, Spain. In March 2014, Paco Montalvo was included by Nestle as one of the four most outstanding violinists of the 21st century.

== Career ==
Following his debut with the Spanish Radio and Television Symphony Orchestra, Montalvo began a prolific public career, performing as a soloist with numerous orchestras and in festivals and recitals all over Europe, Asia, and America. At the age of 17, one of his international appearances was made with the Israel Symphony Orchestra in Tel-Aviv, Israel. The concert was such a success that, less than a year later, Montalvo was invited to perform as a soloist in the legendary Carnegie Hall.

=== Successful debut in Carnegie Hall ===
On April 24, 2011, Montalvo gave a historic performance in New York's emblematic Carnegie Hall. Accompanied by the New England Symphonic Orchestra and conducted by British composer John Rutter, he played Niccolò Paganini’s Concerto No. 1 with such technical mastery and maturity that American critics hailed him as a “dazzling” musician, saying that his solos “thrilled the audience.” Paco Montalvo is the first violinist of the 21st century to debut in the Stern Auditorium on the Perelman Stage there at the age of 18.

== Discography ==
- 2015 - Alma del violín flamenco
- 2016 - Alma del violín flamenco en vivo
- 2017 - Corazon Flamenco

== Music studies ==
Montalvo has studied at such prestigious universities and conservatories as the Moscow Conservatory; the Mozarteum University of Salzburg, Austria; the University of Charlotte, North Carolina; the Queen Sofia College of Music in Madrid; the Barenboim-Said Foundation in Seville, Spain; and the Meadowmount School of Music in New York.

By age 16, Montalvo had finished his studies at the Rafael Orozco Conservatory of Music, graduating with honors and receiving the highest certification for the violin offered by the institution. When he earned his degree at 18, he became one of the youngest university graduates in Europe.

== Maestros ==
His lengthy list of violin instructors includes David Russel, Zakhar Bron, Jean-Jacques Kantorow, Igor Ozim, Mathis Fischer, Klaus Peter, Victor Pikaizen, Salvatore Accardo, Yuri Volguin, Sally Thomas, Alexander Tronstiansky, Joel Smirnoff, Serguei Teslia, Ruben Aharonyan, Gonçal Comellas, Luis Gallardo, Serguei Fatkouline, José Gámez, Ara Bogdanian, Pavel Vernikov et Alexander Markov.

== International presentations ==
In May 2006, Montalvo made his first trip to the United States, to Chicago, after being selected by the "Stradivari Society" as one of the most outstanding young soloists in the world. Montalvo played in the Concert Hall Stradivari, on "The Cathedral", a concert violin charged by Stradivari in 1707.

In November 2007, Montalvo performed with the National Orchestra of Cuba in the National Theater of Havana, under the direction of Juan Luis González.

He was selected as an ambassador to represent his hometown of Córdoba, Spain in a cultural tour of Poland, in 2009. In February 2011, he began filming "Córdoba, life and genius". Montalvo was one of the main characters of the film alongside some of the most famous artists of the city, including the guitarist Vicente Amigo and flamenco singer El Pele.

Each January, starting in 2011 and continuing until at least 2013, Montalvo has collaborated with the Spanish Senate to hold an International Day of Remembrance of the Holocaust, in furtherance of the Senate's goal to prevent future crimes against humanity.

In March 2012, he performed as soloist with the Budapest Strings Chamber Orchestra in the Danube Palace as part of a series of concerts featuring the work of Pablo Sarasate.

In April 2012, Montalvo was invited by violinist Shlomo Mintz to perform in “The Violins of Hope” concert series in the United States. The concert was broadcast nationwide on National Public Radio.

In March 2013, Paco Montalvo had a meeting with Yael Naim, an Israeli singer with whom he has worked on several projects. In May of that same year, the North American actress Eva Longoria invited Montalvo to Paris for "The Global Gift Gala".

In July 2013, Montalvo won the "Arthur Rubinstein Award for Excellence in Interpretation and Musical Composition". That same month, he performed Mozart's Third Concerto, with the conductor Peter Tiboris, in Greece as part of the IX ° International Festival of the Aegean.
