= Bustillos =

Bustillos is a surname. Notable people with the surname include:

- Edwin Bustillos (1964–2003), Mexican scientist
- Juan Bustillos Montalvo (born 1955), Mexican politician
- Victorino Márquez Bustillos (1858–1941), Venezuelan lawyer and politician
