= List of storms named Raymond =

The name Raymond has been used for six tropical cyclones worldwide: Five in the Eastern Pacific and one in the Australian region.

Eastern Pacific:

- Hurricane Raymond (1983) – long-lived Category 4 hurricane; pounded the big island of Hawaii with very high surf
- Hurricane Raymond (1989) – Category 4 hurricane; made landfall as a tropical storm on the Baja California peninsula and later in Sonora
- Hurricane Raymond (2013) – Category 3 hurricane; briefly threatened the southwestern coast of Mexico before moving out to sea
- Tropical Storm Raymond (2019) – short-lived storm which dissipated without affecting land
- Tropical Storm Raymond (2025) – strong short-lived storm which formed near Mexico and affected Baja California as a tropical depression

Australian Region:

- Cyclone Raymond (2005) – made landfall on the northern coast of Australia
