= Tropical Storm Raymond (2025) =

Eastern Pacific tropical storm in 2025

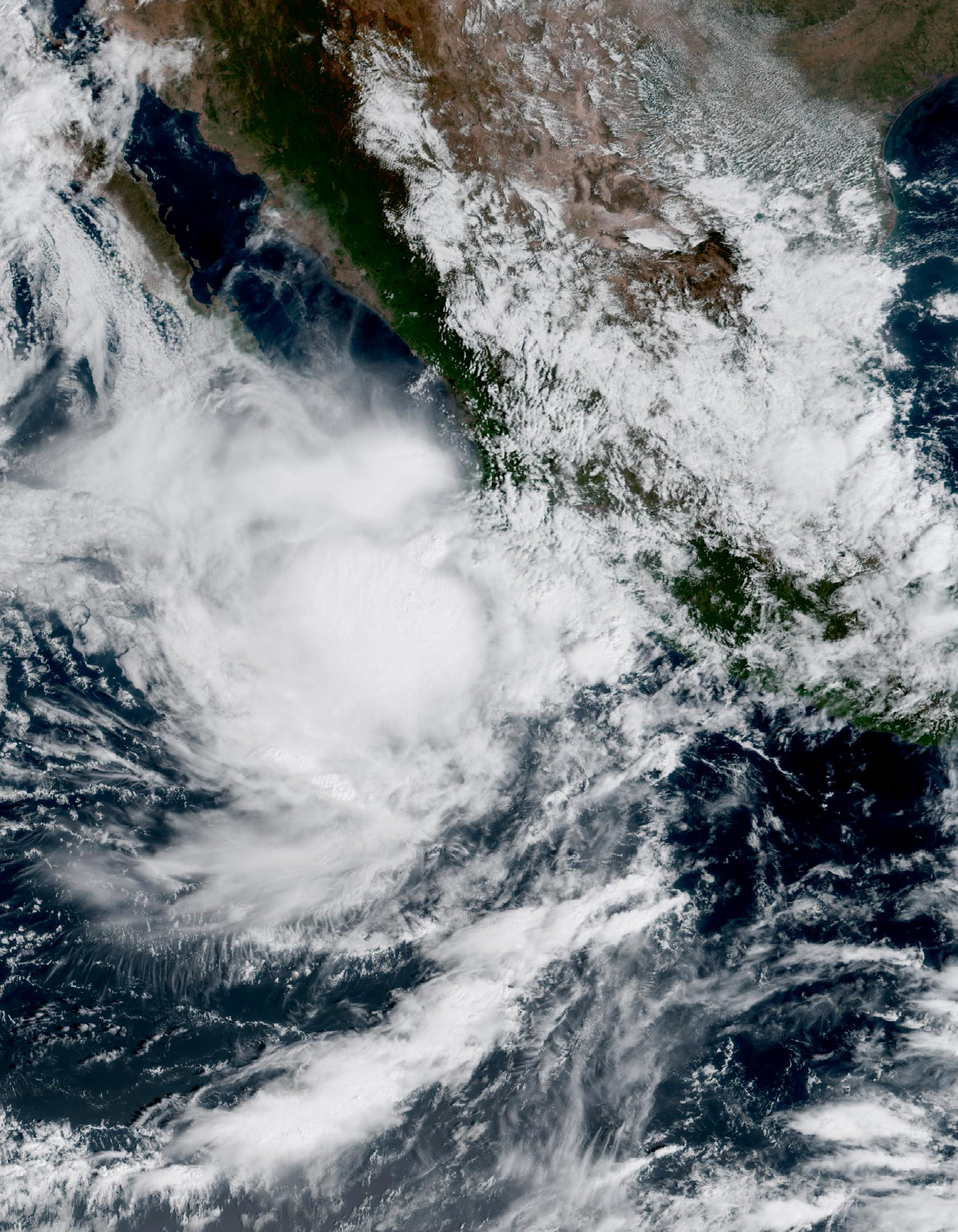
- Raymond at peak intensity off the coast of Mexico on October 10.

Meteorological history
- Formed: October 9, 2025
- Remnant low: October 11, 2025
- Dissipated: October 12, 2025

Tropical storm
- 1-minute sustained (SSHWS/NWS)
- Highest winds: 60 mph (95 km/h)
- Lowest pressure: 998 mbar (hPa); 29.47 inHg

Overall effects
- Fatalities: 4
- Damage: >$1.27 million (2025 USD)
- Areas affected: Northern Central America, Southern Mexico, Baja California Sur, Southwestern United States
- IBTrACS
- Part of the 2025 Pacific hurricane season

Tropical Storm Raymond was a short-lived tropical storm that affected portions of western Mexico and the Southwestern United States in October 2025. The nineteenth named storm of the 2025 Pacific hurricane season, Raymond developed from a trough of low pressure located off the coast of southwestern Mexico on October 9. Raymond then moved west-northwestward to northwestward, parallel to the southwestern coast of Mexico while strengthening. On October 10, Raymond reached peak intensity with maximum sustained winds of 60 mph (95 km/h) and a minimum central pressure of 998 mbar (29.47 inHg). However, an unfavorable environment for intensification caused Raymond to weaken and degenerate into a remnant low on October 11 offshore the Baja California peninsula. Raymond then dissipated on October 12 in the Gulf of California.

In anticipation of Raymond, tropical storm warnings and watches were issued for coastal portions of the southwestern coast of Mexico and the southern tip of the Baja California peninsula. As Raymond paralleled the southwestern coast of Mexico, it brought heavy rainfall that caused flash flooding that inundated 1,260 homes in Puerto Vallarta. Overall, Raymond caused four deaths and more than US$1.27 million worth of damage.

== Meteorological history ==
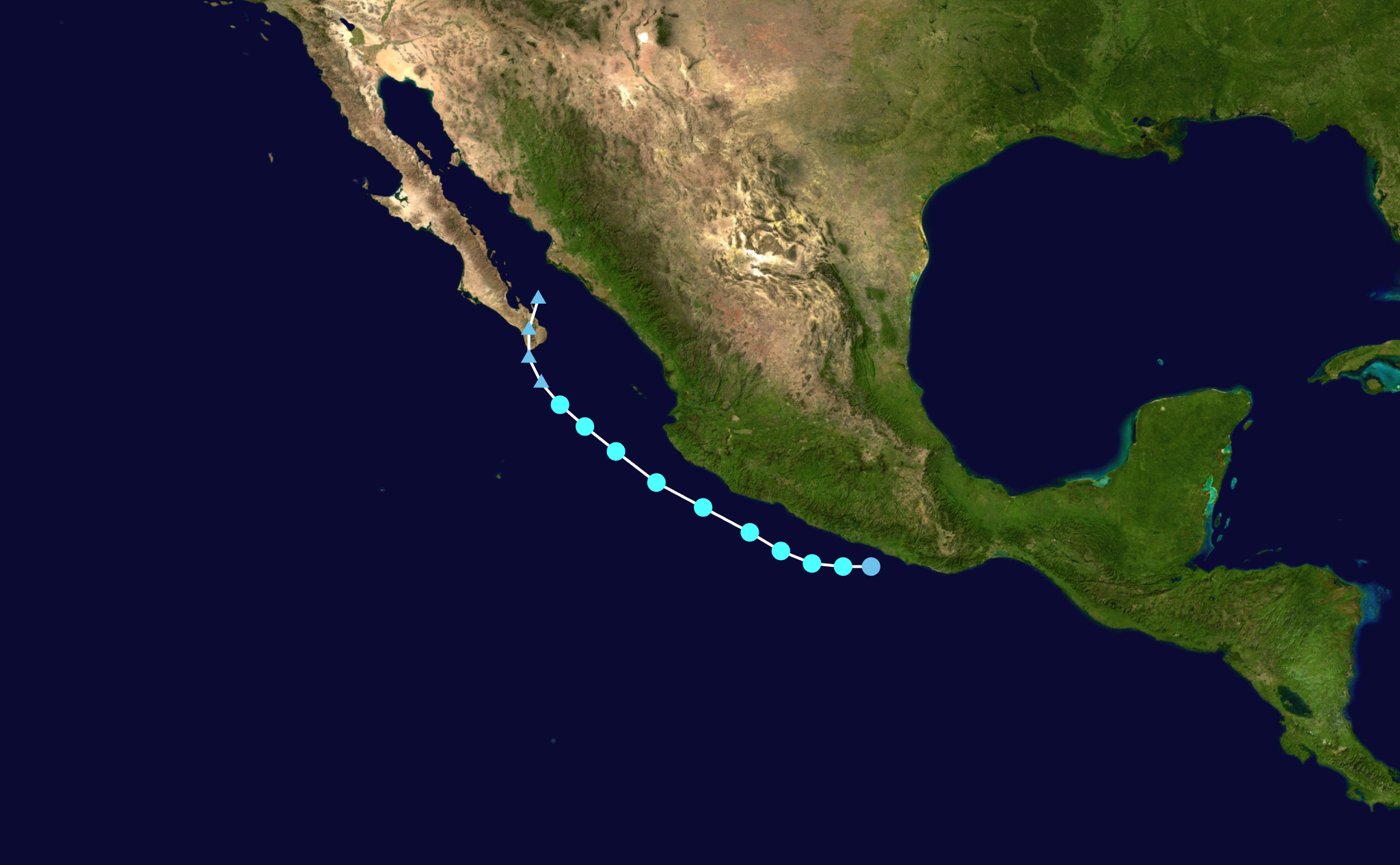
Map plotting the storm's track and intensity, according to the Saffir–Simpson scale Map key Saffir–Simpson scale Tropical depression (≤38 mph, ≤62 km/h) Tropical storm (39–73 mph, 63–118 km/h) Category 1 (74–95 mph, 119–153 km/h) Category 2 (96–110 mph, 154–177 km/h) Category 3 (111–129 mph, 178–208 km/h) Category 4 (130–156 mph, 209–251 km/h) Category 5 (≥157 mph, ≥252 km/h) Unknown Storm type Tropical cyclone Subtropical cyclone Extratropical cyclone, remnant low, tropical disturbance, or monsoon depression

On October 1, a trough of low pressure formed off the coast of Southwestern Mexico. Initially, the system struggled to organize due to its close proximity to land, easterly vertical wind shear, and the influence of Hurricane Priscilla to the system's west-northwest. However, by October 9 at 06:00 UTC, the system acquired a center of circulation, causing the National Hurricane Center (NHC) to designate the low as Tropical Depression Seventeen-E. By 09:00 UTC that same day, the depression strengthened into a tropical storm and was assigned the name Raymond.

Raymond then began to move west-northwestward to northwestward, parallel to the Pacific coast of Mexico due to the influence of a ridge. Moving into an environment characterized by warm sea surface temperatures, Raymond began to strengthen, with convection beginning to increase on the western and southern sides of the storm. By October 10 at 06:00 UTC, Raymond attained peak intensity, with maximum sustained winds of 60 mph (95 km/h) with a minimum central pressure of 998 mbar (29.47 inHg). Shortly after, strong easterly wind shear and dry-air caused Raymond to begin a weakening trend, with all convection within the storm displacing from its center of circulation. By October 11 at 18:00 UTC, all convection within the storm dissipated and Raymond degenerated to a remnant low just south of the Baja California peninsula. The remnant low turned northward to north-northeastward due to the influence of a trough over the Southwestern United States. Raymond then moved over the southern tip of the Baja California peninsula and dissipated over the Gulf of California on October 12 at 18:00 UTC.

== Preparations and impact ==
=== Mexico ===
Tropical storm warnings and watches were issued for coastal areas of Southwestern Mexico and the southern tip of the Baja California peninsula. A green emergency alert, signifying a low level of danger, was issued for Colima, Jalisco, and Michoacán. A blue emergency alert, signifying a minimal level of danger, was issued for Guerrero, Nayarit, and Baja California Sur. Classes for all grades in ten municipalities of Jalisco were cancelled in anticipation of Raymond. In coastal portions of Oaxaca, classes were cancelled at more than 4,700 schools. The ports of Zihuatanejo, Acapulco, and Lázaro Cárdenas, were closed to boat traffic. In Colima, beaches were closed due to rough surf generated by Raymond. 60 residents in Puerto Vallarta and 107 residents in Baja California Sur evacuated to shelters prior to the storm's arrival.

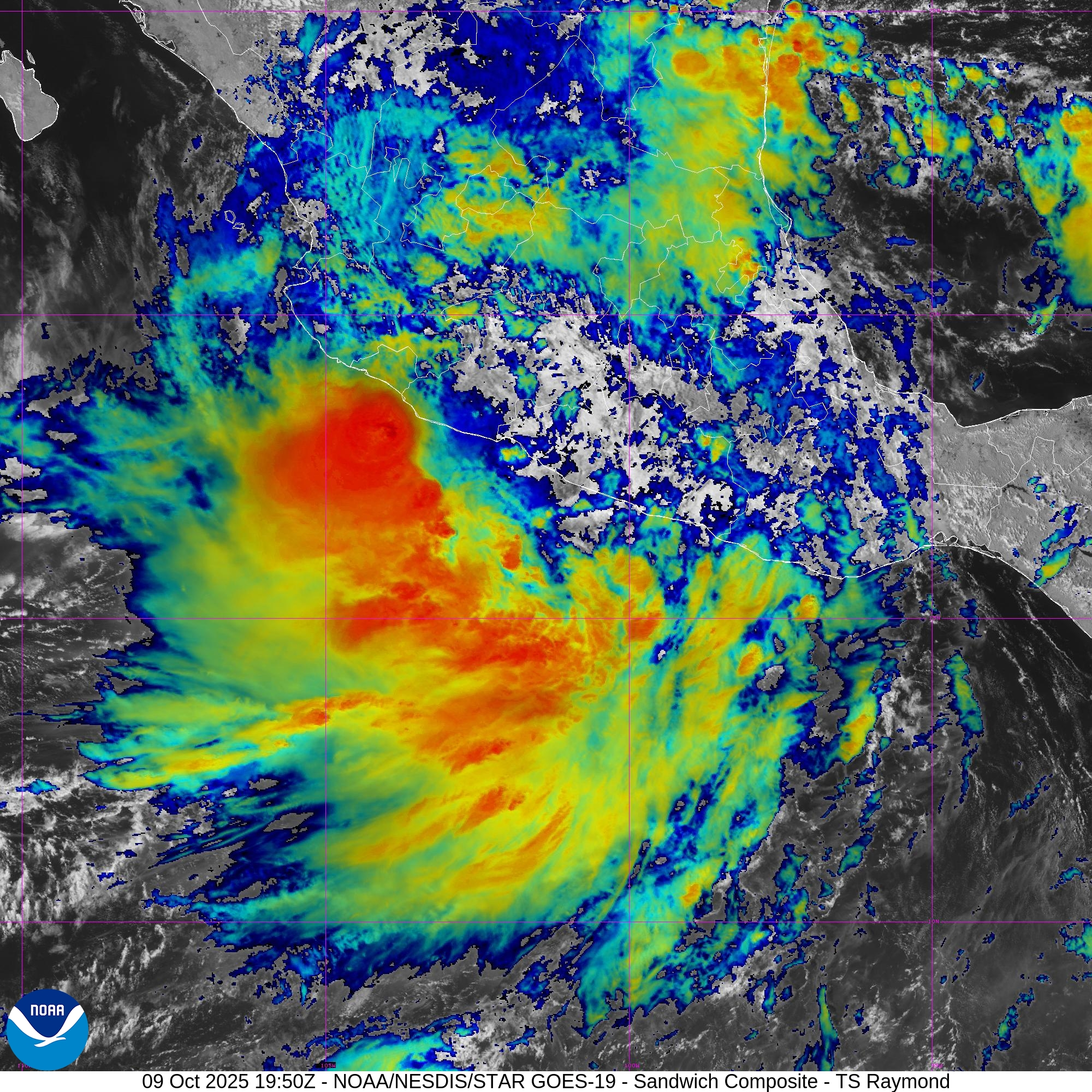
Raymond impacting southwestern Mexico

As Raymond paralleled the coast of Mexico, its primary effect was heavy rainfall that triggered flash flooding and mudslides. A peak rainfall total of 189.5 mm (7.46 in) was reported Zihuatanejo. A rainfall total of 174 mm (6.9 in) was reported in La Desembocada, Guerrero. In Guerrero, heavy rainfall from Raymond flooded seven neighborhoods and 48 homes. Damage was reported across at least eight municipalities. At least ten vehicles were damaged by floodwaters. Traffic congestion was reported as a result of roadways obstructed by mudslides. A portion of a road in Atlamajalcingo del Monte leading to Zilacayotitlán collapsed while a school in Huamuxtitlán was damaged by floodwaters. Power outages were reported across nine neighborhoods. A shelter was opened for 48 families whose homes suffered flood damage.

Heavy rainfall from the precursor of Raymond triggered flash flooding and landslides across Chiapas and Oaxaca. In Chiapas, more than 247 homes across 21 municipalities were inundated by floodwaters. In Venustiano Carranza, a transmission tower collapsed, causing the loss of power to more than 300,000 residents. As a result, 119 Comisión Federal de Electricidad workers and 25 vehicles were mobilized to repair the tower. In Acapetahua, the Cintalapa River overflowed, resulting in the evacuation of 49 residents. In Villa Comaltitlán, seven rivers overflowed, causing floodwaters to inundate 24 communities. In Oaxaca, homes and crops were damaged by floodwaters. At least two people were killed and two others were injured.

Heavy rainfall from the remnants of Raymond triggered flash flooding across Jalisco and Nayarit. In Puerto Vallarta, 1,260 homes, 85 businesses, three schools and a church were damaged by floodwaters. Seven sewage canals overflowed and more than 300 vehicles were damaged. Damage was reported across at least eight neighborhoods and 90 people were rescued from floodwaters. Flood damage at a university was estimated at Mex$5 million (US$270,000). A man drowned after his truck was swept away by an overflowing river while a soldier was hospitalized after being electrocuted. The National System for Integral Family Development delivered more than 600 meals to residents affected by the flooding. In Zacualpan, Nayarit, 40 homes were damaged and three homes were destroyed by floodwaters. Two elementary schools were damaged. Three bridges collapsed and a portion of the Ixtapa de la Concepción-Zacualpan highway was destroyed. Families suffered crop and livestock losses from the storm.

Heavy rainfall from the remnants of Raymond also triggered flooding and landslides across Sinaloa, Sonora, and Baja California Sur. In Sinaloa, 26 residents were evacuated to a shelter and five rural communities were left without running water. Following the storm, Governor of Sinaloa Rubén Rocha Moya approved the distribution of 6,000 pesos each in financial aid to 30 families affected by the flooding. In Sonora, flooding was reported in at least eight municipalities. More than 70 flooded roadways and stranded vehicles were reported. At least five vehicles were swept away by floodwaters. In Cabo San Lucas, 21 sewage canals overflowed and power outages were reported across three neighborhoods.

Additionally, moisture from the remnants of Raymond, Hurricane Priscilla and a tropical wave in the Gulf of Mexico triggered flash flooding and landslides across central and southeastern Mexico.

=== Elsewhere ===
As remnant moisture from Raymond neared the Southwestern United States, the National Weather Service issued 25 flash flood warnings across Arizona. Flash flood warnings and watches were also issued for the southern San Juan Mountains in Colorado.

Remnant moisture from Raymond brought heavy rainfall that triggered flash flooding and rockslides across portions of the Southwestern United States. In Arizona, street flooding and water rescues were reported. Portions of U.S. Route 60 were washed away by floodwaters. In Queen Valley, at least fifteen homes were flooded and at least two homes were destroyed. In Maricopa County, 4-5 homes were damaged and a 42-year-old man drowned after his vehicle was swept away by floodwaters. Phoenix Sky Harbor International Airport reported 99 delayed flights. Damage statewide totaled to more than US$1 million.

== See also ==
- Weather of 2025
- Tropical cyclones in 2025
- Other storms with the same name
- List of Baja California Peninsula hurricanes
- Timeline of the 2025 Pacific hurricane season
