= October 2025 Mexican floods and landslides =

- Date: October 2025
- Location: At least 150 municipalities and cities in Mexico, mainly in Sierra Madre Oriental and Huastec states (Hidalgo, Puebla, Querétaro, San Luis Potosí and Veracruz)
- Cause: Remnants of Hurricane Priscilla, Tropical Storm Raymond, and an Atlantic tropical wave
- Deaths: 84 (as of 21 November 2025)
- Missing: 17
- Property damage: About 1,000 km (620 mi) of roads 100,000+ houses 59 medical facilities 308 schools

In October 2025, severe floods and landslides caused by heavy rains and attributed to remnants of storms occurred in several Mexican states. These weather events affected over 150 cities and municipalities, killing 84 people, leaving more than 320,000 others without power, about 100,000 houses destroyed, 17 missing and nearly 1,000 km (620 mi) of roads damaged. 2,400 schools and 7,831 businesses were damaged and 288 communities were left isolated. 56,000 hectares of farmland were affected. Insurance companies received approximately 1,200 claims. Officials estimated that total structural damage amounted to Mex$3.973 billion (US$219 million), while vehicle damage amounted to Mex$680 million (US$39.2 million). As of January 2026, Aon estimated that economic losses totaled to US$750 million.

== Background ==
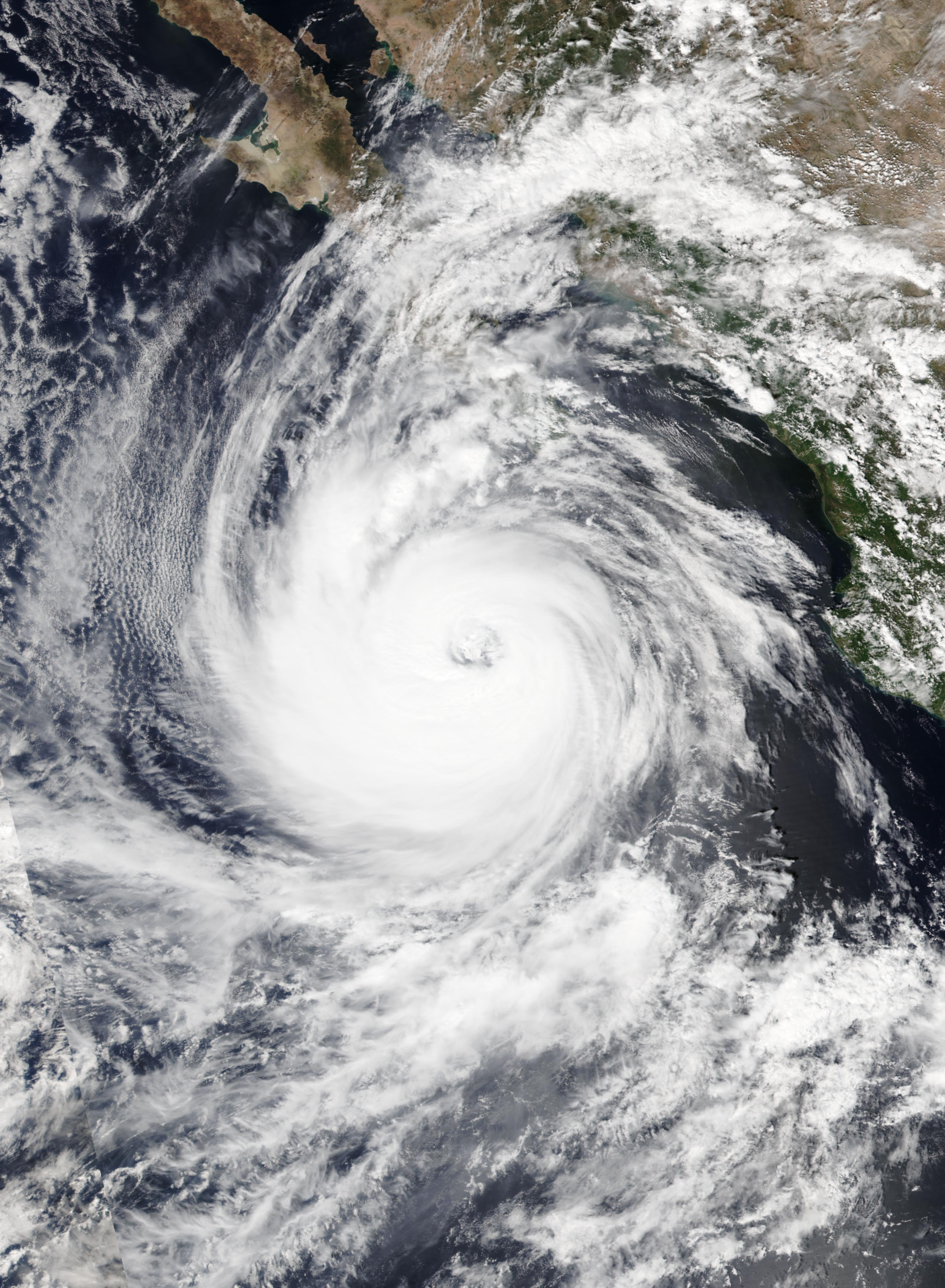
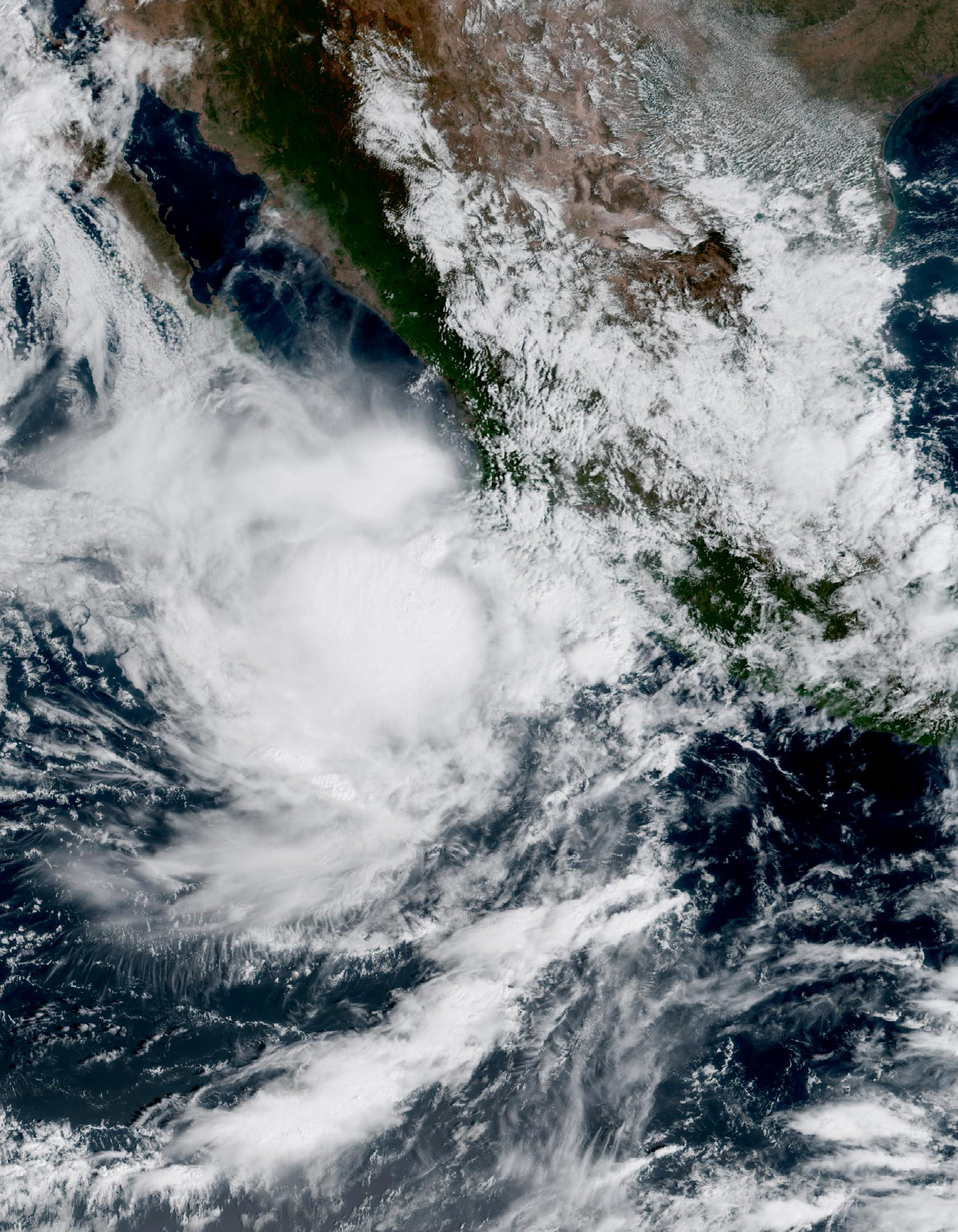
Remnants of both Hurricane Priscilla (left, at its peak intensity on 7 October 2025) and Tropical Storm Raymond (right, at its peak intensity on 10 October 2025) are attributed as the cause of the heavy rains.

Mexico experienced unusually heavy rainfall in 2025, with Mexico City recording its wettest June in over 20 years. Authorities have related the deadly downpours to the remnants of Hurricane Priscilla, Tropical Storm Raymond, and a tropical wave over the Gulf of Mexico. Both Priscilla and Raymond previously affected Baja California Sur, Chiapas, Guerrero, Jalisco, Michoacán, Nayarit, Oaxaca, Sonora and the Southwestern United States with heavy rainfall; however, no injuries or fatalities were reported. A tropical wave entered central Mexico from the Atlantic. Anomalous moisture from the wave then caused several areas of low pressure to form near the Atlantic and Pacific coasts of Mexico. These areas of low pressure then interacted with moisture from the remnants of Hurricane Priscilla and Tropical Storm Raymond, causing heavy rain to fall across central Mexico. Rainfall was exacerbated by the mountainous terrain in the Huasteca region.

== Situation by state ==
Hidalgo was among the worst affected areas, with 21 confirmed deaths and 43 missing. 379 mm (14.9 in) of rain fell was between 7 and 11 October. A state of emergency was declared in 28 municipalities. Landslides and overflowing rivers damaged about 16,000 homes, 59 medical facilities, and 308 schools. Seventeen of its 84 municipalities (in a total of 22 impacted) faced power outages and 150 communities were left without communication. More than 700 residents were left isolated. Flooding damaged 71 roads and 42 bridges. 8,228 hectares of corn, bean, and coffee crops were damaged and at least 282 cattle and 15,000 birds were lost. Sections of an irrigation canal collapsed. The town of Chapula was declared uninhabitable and 144 residents of the town were evacuated. 190 landslides and mudslides and 20 fallen trees were reported. Five bridges partially collapsed and six rivers overflowed. Numerous vehicles were buried by mudslides. In Aztlán, a pickup truck was destroyed after being swept away by a mudslide. Ten people were hospitalized. In Huautla, 36 families were left homeless.

In Veracruz, over 530 mm (more than 21 in) of rainfall fell between 6 and 9 October alone. The state recorded 30 deaths (including a police officer), while nearly 30,000 homes were damaged and 70 municipalities was devastated. 14,000 homes were destroyed. Eighteen others were reported missing. The Mexican Navy evacuated approximately 900 people to shelters. According to Veracruzana University's students, 192 of their colleagues were missing as a result of the disaster, with a female student confirmed dead. The official number of missing people was later revised to around 75. Poza Rica, a major oil city in the region, was hard hit by the overflow of the Cazones River, The waters of the Pantepec River also flooded large parts of Álamo, with streets laying under 1 meter (3 ft) of water and mud, topping by another 2 meters (6 ft) of piled-up trash, furniture and debris. More than 10,000 families were left without power. 41 communities suffered damage and classes were suspended across 39 municipalities. At least 100,000 hectares of orange, lemon, and tangerine crops were damaged by floodwaters. More than 1,000 ranchers were affected by the flooding. Floodwaters caused the leakage of oil pipelines in Poza Rica. 25 families were evacuated from flooded areas. 25 roads were damaged and a total of 220 people were rescued. 46 communities were left isolated. 51 landslides were reported. Following the flooding, 2,085 cases of Dengue fever were reported. 479 schools were affected by the flooding. 2,778 vehicles and 2,100 businesses were damaged. 18 bridges were damaged. In Temapache, the El Colotero monument was damaged by the floods.

In Puebla, 788 mm (31.0 in) of rain fell between 6 and 9 October. 38 municipalities and around 16,000 houses sustained damage, 18 people were killed and 13 were reported missing. Roughly 80,000 people were affected, and rescue efforts included helping people stranded on rooftops. A gas pipeline also ruptured following a landslide. 116 schools were damaged. At least 77 mudslides, landslides, and road collapses were reported. 393 people were rescued. Three fallen billboards were reported. Seven bridges collapsed and power outages were reported across eight municipalities. In Huauchinango, 12 families were rescued from the rooftops of their homes. A levee partially collapsed, spilling 100,000 liters of oil. Two people were hospitalized after being swept away by a landslide. A disaster declaration was issued for 23 municipalities. Five rivers overflowed. 29 sections of highway and two bridges were damaged, leaving 66 communities isolated. In Villa Ávila Camacho, a hospital was flooded, necessitating the evacuation of 17 patients. 83 shelters were opened for families displaced by the flooding. Classes for all grades were suspended at 5,875 schools across 64 municipalities. Dengue fever was reported among residents due to mosquito breeding from stagnant waters brought on the flooding. 3,700 hectares of corn, coffee, bean, and citrus crops were damaged by the rains. 800 fish were lost. In Xicotepec, a tiger killed by a landslide at a zoo after escaping its enclosure.

In San Luis Potosí, 13 municipalities in the eastern Huasteca Potosina region were affected, with an estimated 2,200 houses damaged (at least 25 collapsed) and four bodies of water overflowing or with high flow. At least 12 to 13 communities suffered severe losses. 1,600 residents and 1,360 families were evacuated from flooded areas. At least 13 highways suffered traffic obstruction from landslides, and four towns were isolated. Two municipalities lost access to drinking water. 44 fallen trees were reported.

In Querétaro, eight municipalities in the state's Sierra Gorda region were affected, with the worst damage in Pinal de Amoles and San Joaquín. On 10 October, a six-year-old child died after being swept away by a landslide in Pinal de Amoles. 228 km (142 mi) of road were damaged, with Governor of Querétaro Mauricio Kuri estimating that it would cost Mex$500 million (US$29.1 million) to repair damaged roadways. More than 170 roads were destroyed, isolating 108 communities. 32 schools were damaged and 13 communities were lost access to running water. 147 homes were damaged. 23 families were evacuated from flooded areas. A bridge along the Jalpan River was destroyed by floodwaters. Classes were suspended in four municipalities.

== Response ==
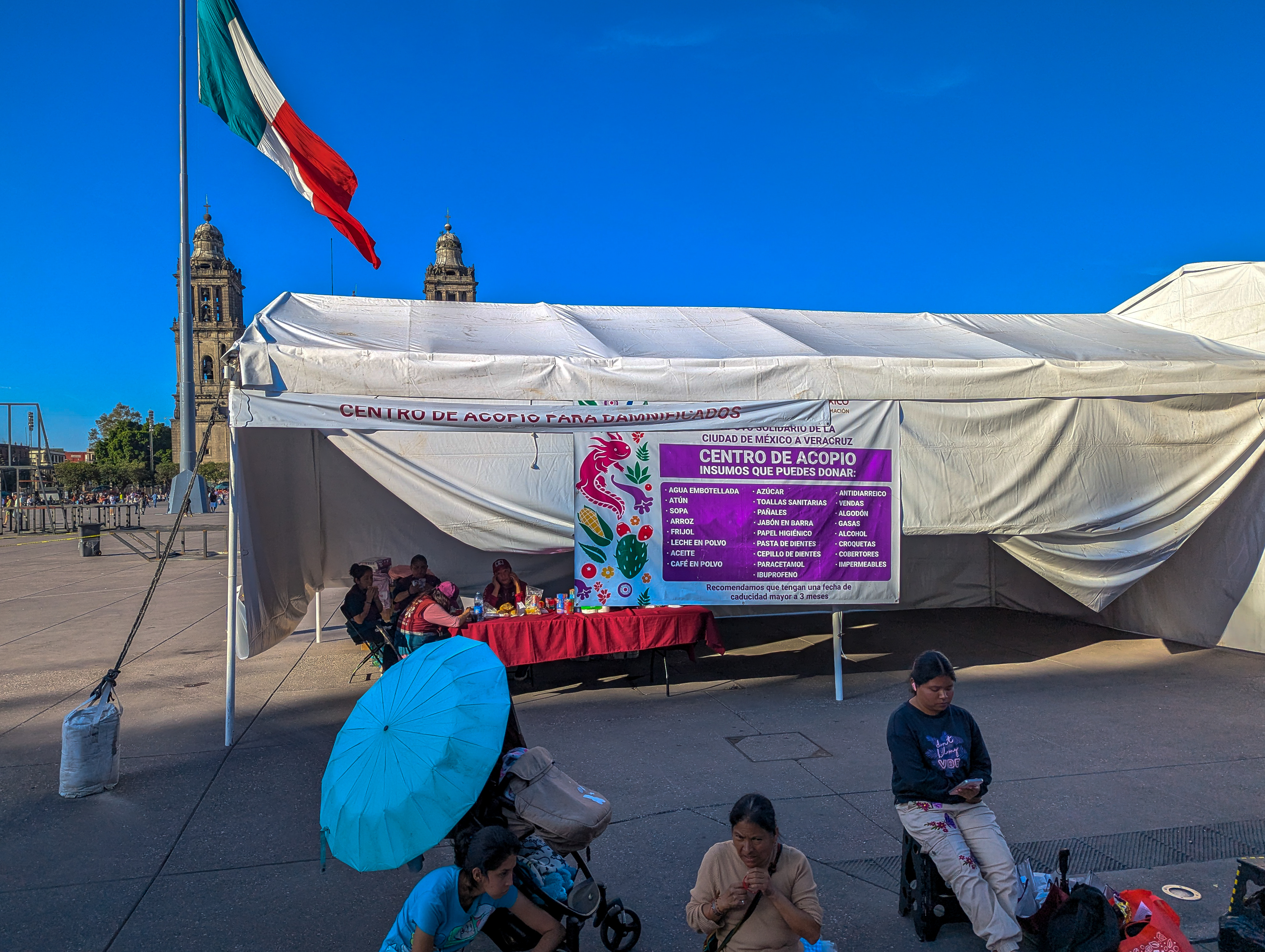
Collection center in Mexico City

In response, the federal government of Mexico initially deployed around 8,700 military personnel, increasing to 10,000 as of 13 October 2025, to assist in rescue and relief operations, especially where roads have been blocked. 14,000 health personnel were deployed to visit residents affected by the flooding. Additionally, 37 Mobile Medical Units were deployed. UNAM reported that at least 65 tons of food and toiletries were donated.

Authorities stated that electricity was temporarily cut off in municipalities across five states, but had been later mostly restored. Comisión Federal de Electricidad mobilized 1,602 electrical workers, 503 pickup trucks, and 219 cranes to restore power. The federal government of Mexico announced that no electricity tariff would be applied to communities affected by the flooding.

Governor of Hidalgo Julio Menchaca said that all classes had been suspended due to the heavy rains. An emergency fund worth Mex$500 million (US$29.1 million) was allocated for 26 municipalities in Hidalgo to address the damage. At least seven helicopters were deployed to transport food to isolated communities and injured residents to hospitals.

On 12 October 2025, President Claudia Sheinbaum participated in a command center videoconference with the governors of Puebla (Alejandro Armenta Mier), Hidalgo (Julio Menchaca), Querétaro (Mauricio Kuri), Veracruz (Rocío Nahle García) and San Luis Potosí (Ricardo Gallardo Cardona). "The message to the people: we know that there is much despair and concern; we will help everyone. Cleaning work will be carried out with full scope, without wasting any resources," stated Sheinbaum at the meeting. She also declared in a post on X: "We continue with attention to the emergency in Veracruz, Hidalgo, Puebla, Querétaro, and San Luis Potosí, in coordination with [...] the governors, as well as various federal authorities. The National Emergency Committee is in permanent session." Some media outlets and commentators criticized the government's response pace and the earlier dissolution of Mexico’s Natural Disaster Fund (FONDEN). The government called the rainfall "unpredictable" while scientists called for climate change planning and better warnings. Mex$13 billion (US$753 million) was invested for reconstruction efforts in states affected by the flooding.

On the same day, Sheinbaum visited Poza Rica, Álamo and Huauchinango, the cities most affected by the floods. Displaced residents in Poza Rica were relocated to Coatzintla.

In Veracruz, relief payments worth Mex$20,000 were announced to be distributed to households affected by the flooding. A Mex$50,000 relief payment was announced to be distributed to businesses affected by the flooding. 2,500 food baskets and 20,000 liters of water were distributed to Tuxpan. Mex$145 million (US$8.37 million) was distributed to unclog the drains of 500 roads. On 15 October, Veracruzana University's students organized protests for the colleague killed during the floods. 4,060 families were relocated from their homes due to the damage caused by the flooding. 337,688 vaccines were administered. 46 dump trucks, 12 helicopters, and eight small planes were deployed.

In San Luis Potosí, 32,000 food supplies and 11,000 cleaning kits were distributed to communities affected by the flooding. 36 shelters were opened and ten medical brigades were mobilized.

In Puebla, 1,200 blankets and mattresses were distributed to families affected by the flooding.

The Government of South Korea donated US$150,000 to support families affected by the flooding. Insurance companies made relief payouts totaling Mex$8.004 billion (US$461 million) to address the damage caused by the flooding.

== See also ==
- 1999 Mexico floods
- 2007 Tabasco flood
- El Colotero, a monument affected by the floods that collapsed in December 2025
