= El Colotero =

Sculpture in Álamo, Veracruz, Mexico

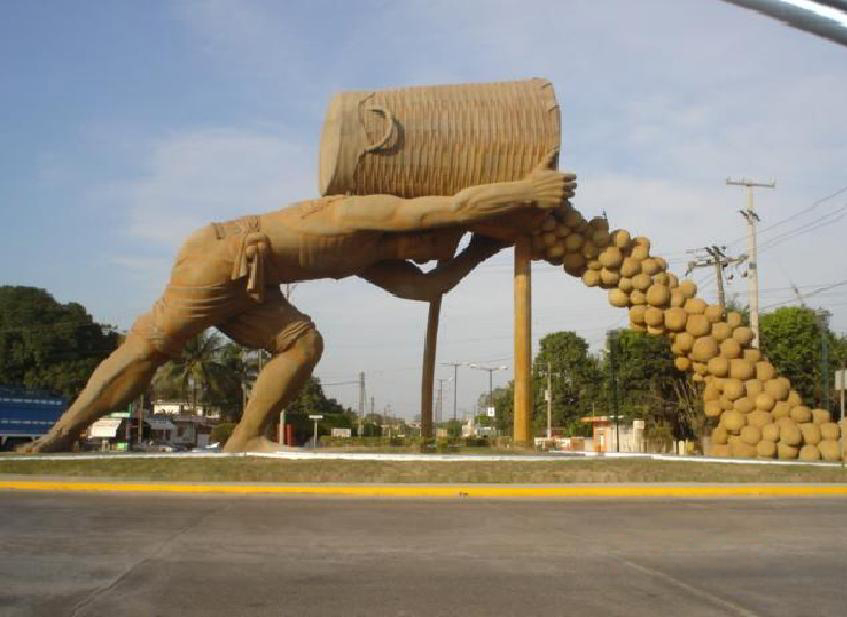
- The sculpture in 2008
- Former location
- Artist: Miguel Vargas Martínez
- Year: 2004
- Medium: Concrete and steel
- Subject: Orange harvester
- Dimensions: 15 m × 30 m (49 ft × 98 ft)
- Condition: Destroyed
- Location: Álamo; 20°54′19.2″N 97°40′45.6″W

El Colotero (transl. The orange harvester) was an outdoor concrete-and-steel monument in Álamo, Veracruz, Mexico. Miguel Vargas Martínez sculpted it, and it was unveiled in 2004. It stood 15 meters (49 ft) tall. The sculpture depicted a male orange harvester, locally known as a colotero, carrying a basket (colote) of 192 oranges, bending to pour them on the ground. The municipality is known for its orange production, and the monument honored the orange harvesters. The complex underwent maintenance on multiple occasions, most recently between 2021 and 2023.

On 16 December 2025, the sculpture collapsed under its own weight after having been damaged during the October 2025 floods that affected the municipality. Governor Rocío Nahle García said a replica would be constructed in the future.

== Description and history ==
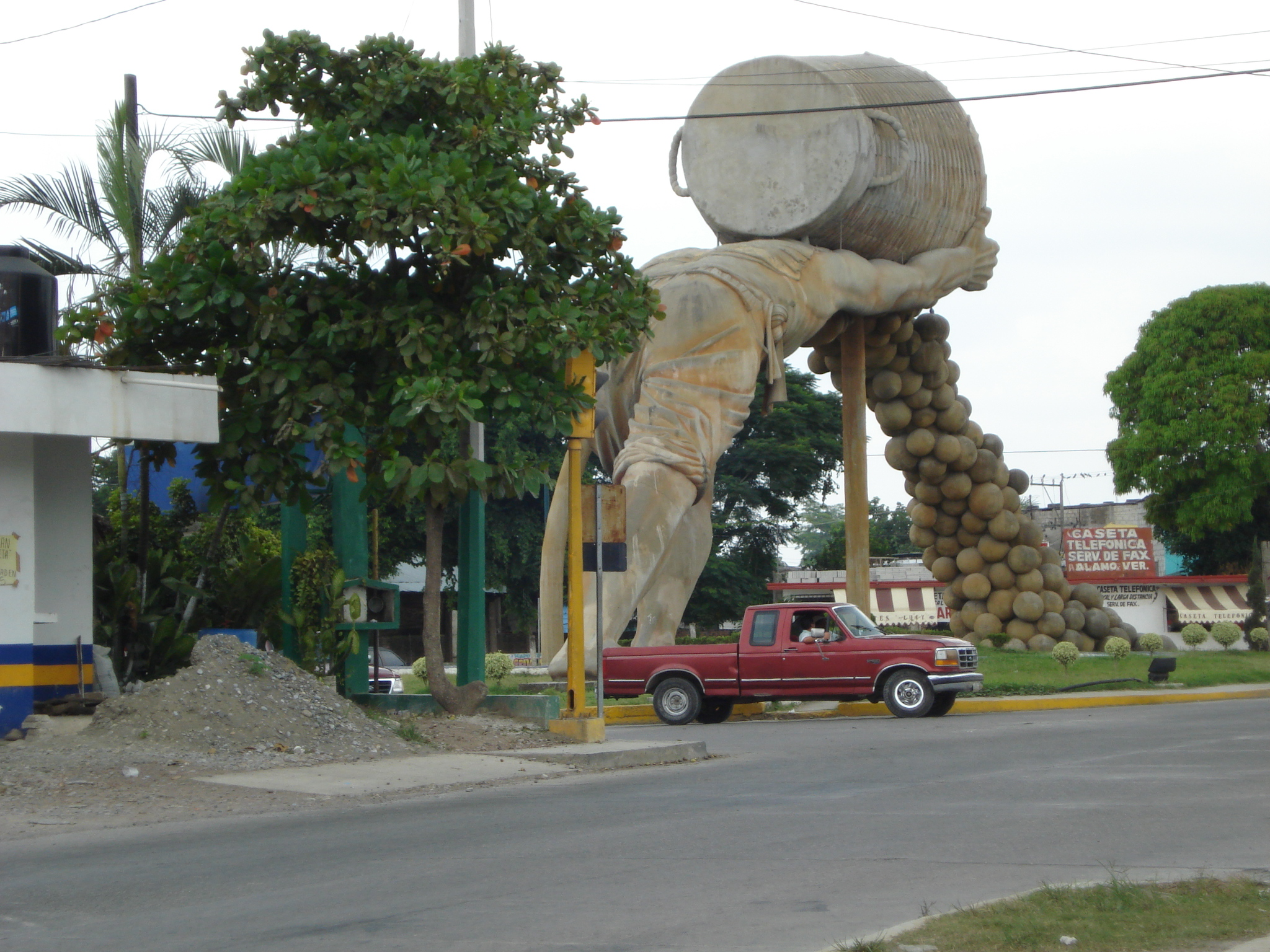
The monument as seen from the adjacent highway

El Colotero was a monument in the town of Álamo, in the municipality of Álamo Temapache, Veracruz. The complex, made of steel rebar and concrete, featured an arched male figure pouring 192 oranges (figuratively 75 kilograms [165 lb] of oranges) onto the ground. The man was depicted shirtless, wearing rolled-up pants, barefoot, and carrying a basket (known as colote) on his back. The monument stood 15 meters (49 ft) tall, was 30 meters (98 ft) long, and had a hollow interior.

It was unveiled in 2004 near Federal Highway 127, the main entrance to the town. Mayor Juan Bustillos Montalvo requested Miguel Vargas Martínez (d. 2022) to create the artwork, which took two years to be completed. El Colotero honored the municipality's orange harvesters; before 2021, Álamo Temapache produced nearly 800,000 metric tons (790,000 long tons; 880,000 short tons) of oranges (almost one third of Veracruz's total production).

During the mayoralty of Jorge Vera, amid the COVID-19 pandemic in Mexico, a giant mask was added to the sculpture to raise awareness of the disease.

=== Restorations ===
El Colotero was restored on three occasions during its lifetime, the last being between 2021 and 2023. Its latest restorer, Miguel Ángel Vargas Miranda, stated that the sculpture had no structural damage; however, the figure's right side exhibited perforations and cracking. Ten of the oranges showed damage, and Vargas Miranda identified multiple signs of bullet impacts. The restoration included a general clean-up, such as the removal of bird nests and beehives, as well as bird and bat droppings. Over all, he considered 95 percent of the sculpture to be in good condition. Vargas Miranda also recommended that it be given annual maintenance because its materials were affected by the tropical climate and vibrations from passing vehicles.

=== Collapse ===
On 16 December 2025, around 8:00 CST (UTC−6), El Colotero collapsed with no injuries or damage reported. The government of Veracruz, led by Rocío Nahle García, acknowledged that reports of deterioration had existed beforehand, and stated that the monument had been damaged by the October 2025 floods in the municipality. Nahle announced that a replica would be installed in the future.
