= Danube Palace =

Concert hall in Budapest, Hungary

Coordinates: 47.5003°N 19.0492°E

- Duna Palota
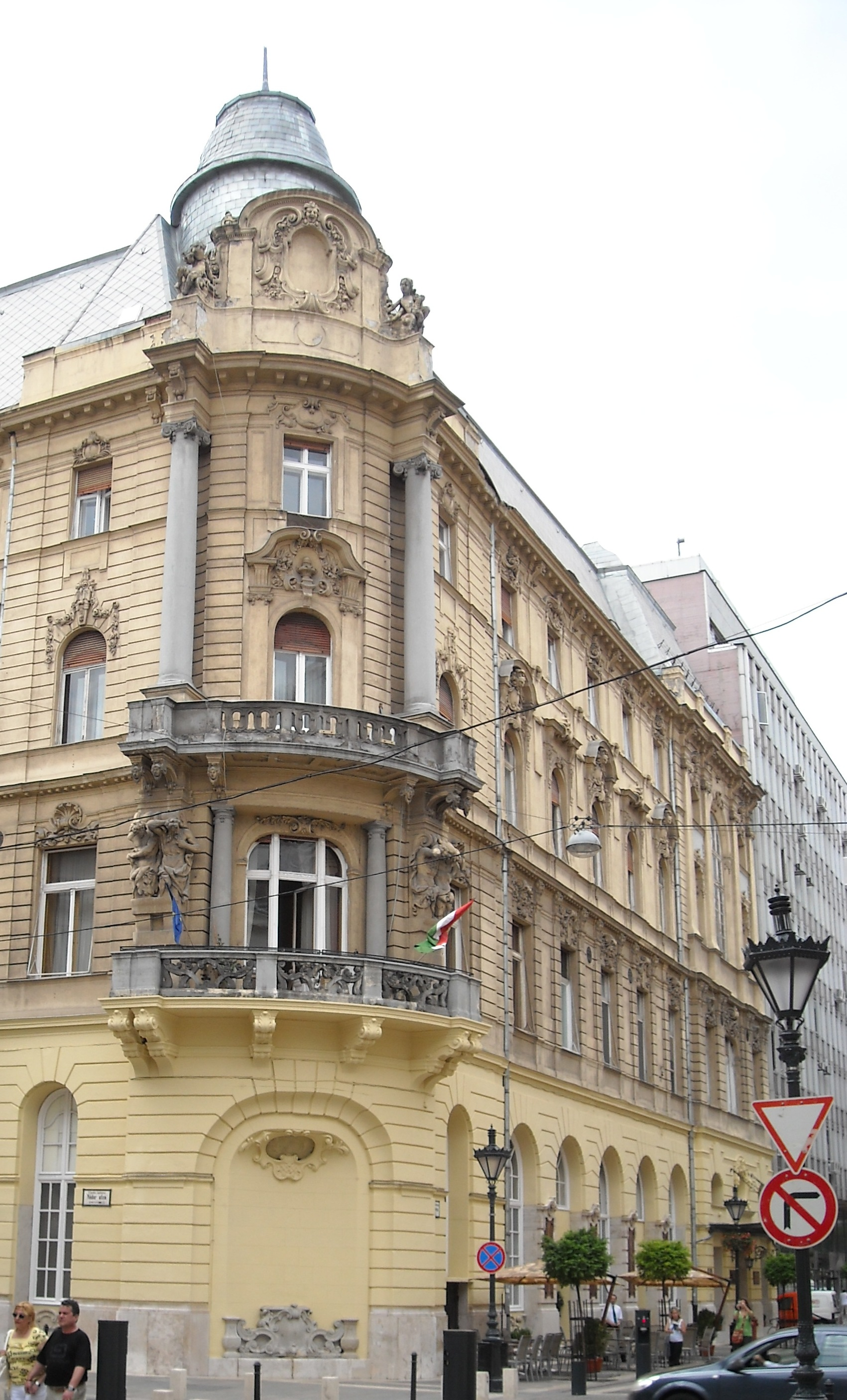
- Interactive map of Danube Palace
- Address: 1051, Zrinyi Street 5. Budapest; Hungary
- Owner: Hungarian State
- Capacity: 294
- Production: cultural events

Construction
- Opened: 1897
- Architect: Vilmos Freund

Website
- Official website

The Danube Palace (Hungarian: Duna Palota [ˈdunɒ ˈpɒlotɒ]) is a Neo-Baroque concert hall located in the Inner City of Budapest, Hungary. It was built between 1883 and 1885 according to the plans of Vilmos Freund. It was known as the casino of Lipótváros – not in the sense of gambling - but an aristocratic club for entertainment. The Palace served as a place of culture, supporting many young artists. Bartók, Kodály, and Dvorák all played in its first-class concert hall. Since 1951 the building has been carrying out the cultural programs of the Ministry of Internal Affairs. It is home to the Danube Symphony Orchestra.

== History ==
The Danube Palace was completed in 1885 as part of Budapest's massive expansion for the millennium celebrations. Hungary was a thousand years old in 1896 and the Habsburg Emperor Franz Joseph I was determined to create a prestigious city that reflected its ancient standing. It was built according to the plans of Vilmos Freund, in co-operation with the contractor Géza Márkus. Originally, the whole palace was decorated with gold motifs, familiar to Baroque churches.

The building took its current shape in 1941. Between 1895 and World War II, the Danube Palace was open for the public for various events. During the war it was completely empty, because that part of the Danube was also the front line between the occupying Soviets on the Pest side, and the Germans on the Buda side. At the end of the war the German military blew up all the bridges that connected the two sides of the Hungarian capital. That is why a few modern buildings can be seen in the area of the Danube palace, including the Sofitel and Intercontinental Hotels.

The Palace today, apart from symphony concerts, has a variety of literary and artistic events and functions, and even folk dancing. It is a popular Budapest tourist attraction where you can get a combined show and Danube cruise.

== Above the restaurant ==
After the war the building was nationalised by the communist government and some changes were made during that era. The balcony, the ceiling and the staircase were rebuilt out of oak. Only a stained-glass composition remained unharmed above the staircase of the restaurant. It was created by Miksa Roth and titled Kenyérünnep (Feast of the new bread). At the center of the glass, there is a woman, who holds a fresh baked loaf of bread made from freshly reaped grains. In the upper left corner, there is a Hungarian soldier holding a flag and next to him there are two working women with a red flag, reminiscent of Soviet times. The Palace has several lovely and elegant salons, each perfect for filming, such as the Brown Salon.

== The Brown Salon ==
The Brown Salon, that once served as a smoking room, is now a conference hall. Béla Bartók performed his opera there, called Bluebeard's Castle. The production was deemed unfit for the stage, surprisingly, as it is one of the composer's most popular pieces. More recently the ornate room has been utilized as a setting for filming. For example, one scene of Evita was filmed there, starring Madonna. It was used as the setting for the bedroom scene where she broke up with her lover, Juan. Another link to the present is the first president of the Casino of Lipótváros, Miksa Falk, was the grandfather of Peter Falk, better known as Columbo.

== The Theater Hall ==
The beautiful theatre hall with its domed ceiling is the main reason why the building is under protection. It is the only theater in Hungary with a cupola. The cupola paintings are the work of Lajos Márk, and the gold ornaments are reminiscent of baroque churches. Above the stage a lyre can be seen. It is an original decoration.

The theatre hall also has an air-conditioning system from the 19th century, similar to the Hungarian Parliament Building. Tunnels on the wall drag cold air from the cellar based on simple pressure difference. Nowadays it is assisted by a modern air-conditioning system.

== The Széchenyi Room ==
This elegant wainscotted room, made up of two interconnected parts, is located opposite the grand staircase, It has marble columns, a fireplace and mirror, coffered gold ceiling and walls faborításúak. It was named in honor of István Széchenyi, a politician and writer, known as the "Greatest Hungarian". Like most of the rooms in the Danube Palace today, it can be hired for private functions.
