= Vilmos Freund =

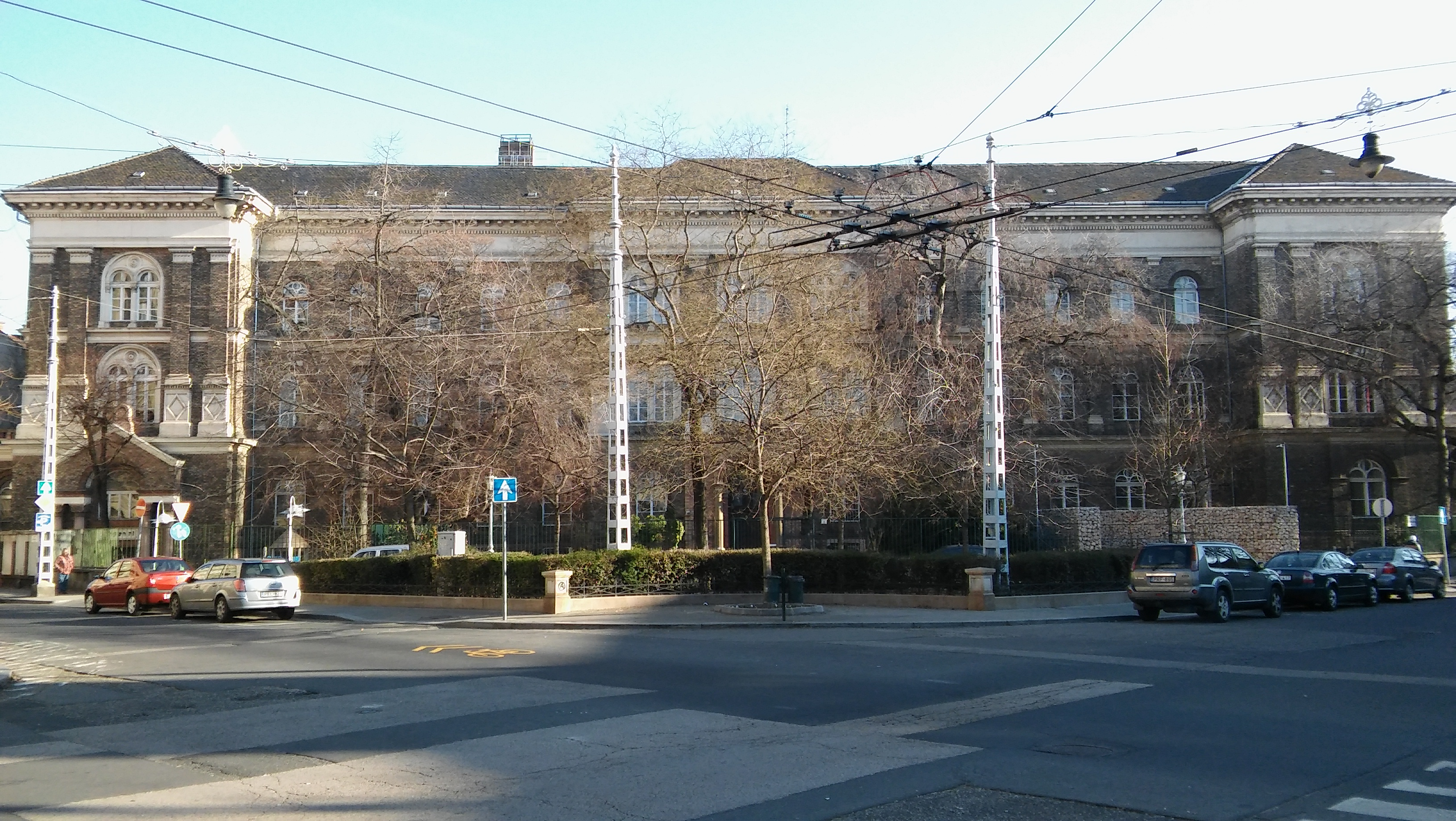
the Bethlen Square Palace of the National Institute for the Deafblind of Israel

Vilmos Freund (22 August 1846 – 26 June 1920) was a Hungarian Jewish architect.

== Life ==
After graduating from high school he studied in Zürich (1866). In Budapest, he first appeared in the design competition of the new Parliament in 1883, and has since been successful in the following competition: Budapest Izr. Hospital 1888, New York Palace 1892, Lipótváros Casino.

== Works ==
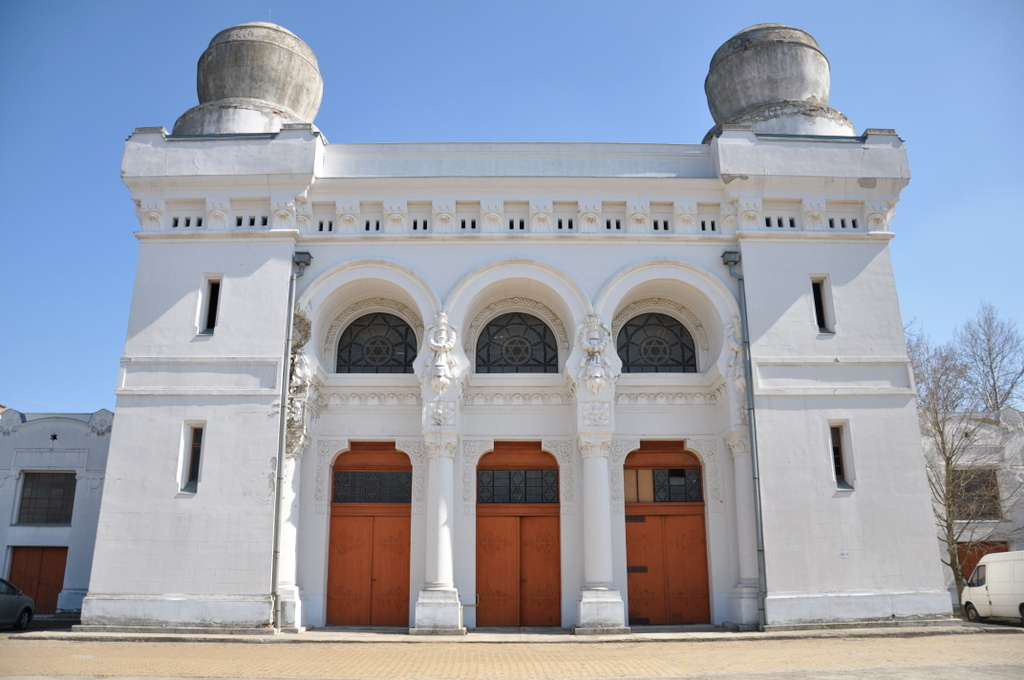
The mortuary of the Jewish cemetery in Kozma street

He built several private palaces in Budapest, mainly on Andrássy út (Swabian Palace 1885-87), in addition to several hospital buildings:

- Ferenc József Commercial Hospital
- Szabolcs-street hospital of the Pest Jewish Community (1889)
- Bródy Adél Children's Hospital (1895–96)
- the Bethlen Square Palace of the National Institute for the Deafblind of Israel. (today McDaniel College Budapest operates in it)
- one of his best-known works is the palace of the Lipótváros Casino (1896), which won the artist prize at the turn of the millennium (1896)
- the mortuary of the Jewish cemetery in Rákoskeresztúr
- the palace of the Erzsébet-körút Körút bath
- in the Son of the Adriatic Naval Palace.

== Sources ==
- Magyar zsidó lexikon. editor Ujvári Péter. Budapest: Magyar Zsidó Lexikon's edition. 1929.
