= 1951 North Indian Ocean cyclone season =

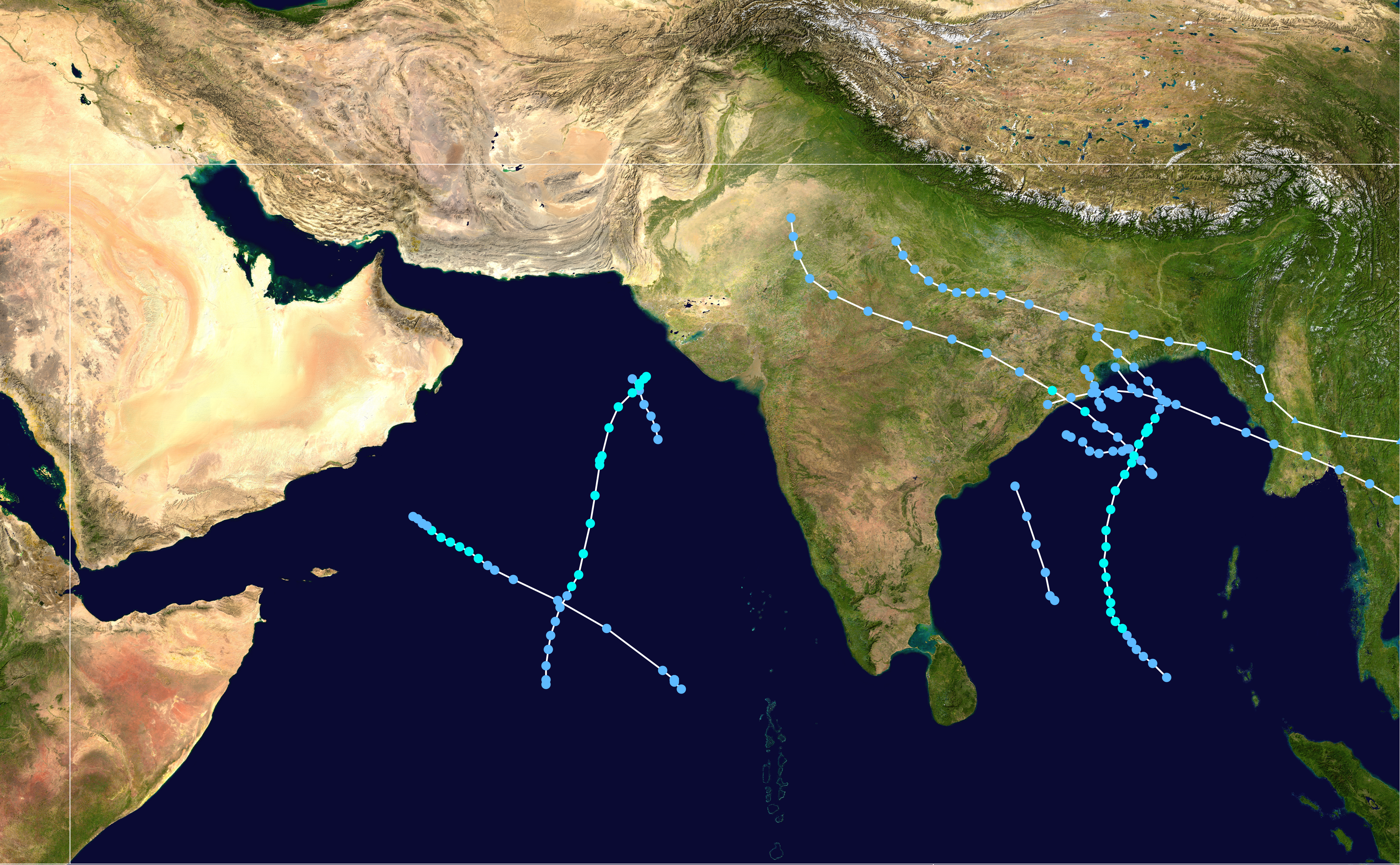
- Season summary map

Seasonal boundaries
- First system formed: April 15, 1951
- Last system dissipated: December 14, 1951

Seasonal statistics
- Depressions: 15
- Deep depressions: 4
- Cyclonic storms: 2
- Total fatalities: Unknown
- Total damage: Unknown

Related articles
- 1951 Atlantic hurricane season; 1951 Pacific hurricane season; 1951 Pacific typhoon season

The 1951 North Indian Ocean cyclone season was part of the annual cycle of tropical cyclone formation. The season has no official bounds but cyclones tend to form between April and December. These dates conventionally delimit the period of each year when most tropical cyclones form in the northern Indian Ocean. There are two main seas in the North Indian Ocean—the Bay of Bengal to the east of the Indian subcontinent and the Arabian Sea to the west of India. The official Regional Specialized Meteorological Centre in this basin is the India Meteorological Department (IMD), while the Joint Typhoon Warning Center (JTWC) releases unofficial advisories. An average of five tropical cyclones form in the North Indian Ocean every season with peaks in May and November. Cyclones occurring between the meridians 45°E and 100°E are included in the season by the IMD.

Like in the previous season, most of the storms formed in the season are weak, as four of the fifteen tropical depressions formed intensified to become tropical cyclones. However, unlike the previous season, two severe cyclonic storms formed during the season.

== Systems ==
=== Cyclonic Storm One ===
- Cyclonic storm (IMD)
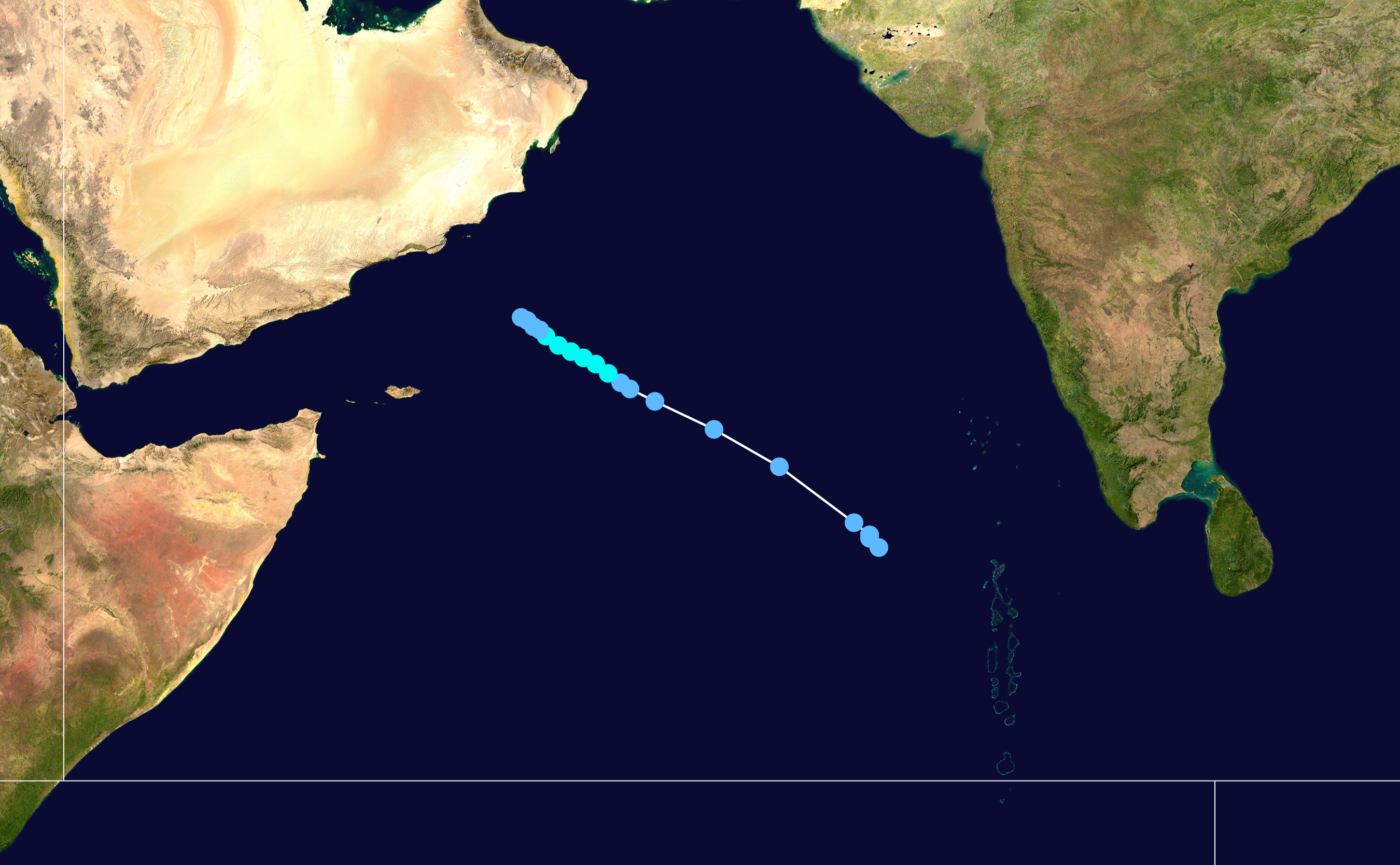
- Duration: April 15 – April 24
- Peak intensity: 65 km/h (40 mph) (3-min); 998.3 hPa (mbar)

=== Depression Two ===
- Depression (IMD)
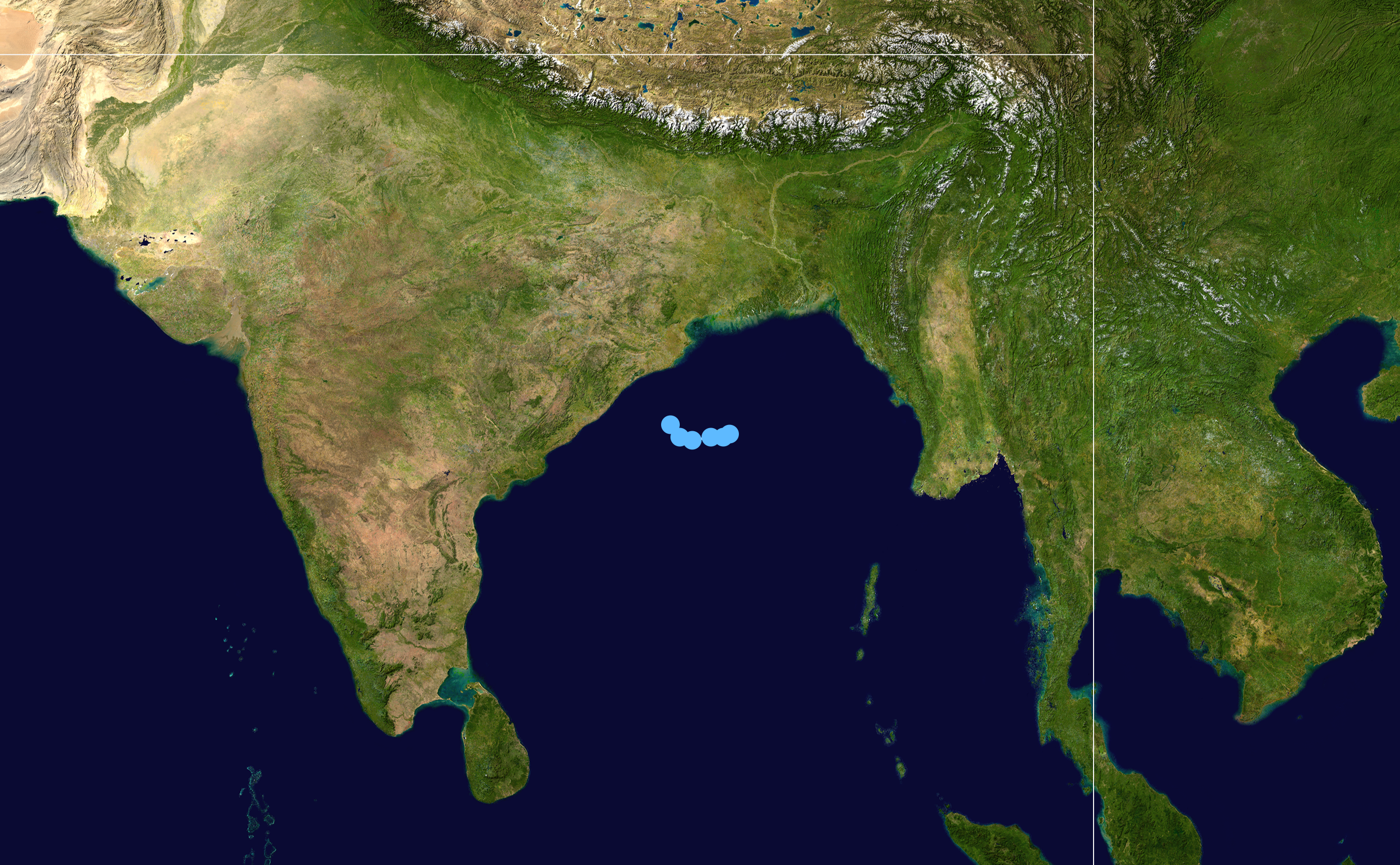
- Duration: June 4 – June 5
- Peak intensity: Winds not specified;

=== Depression Three ===
- Depression (IMD)
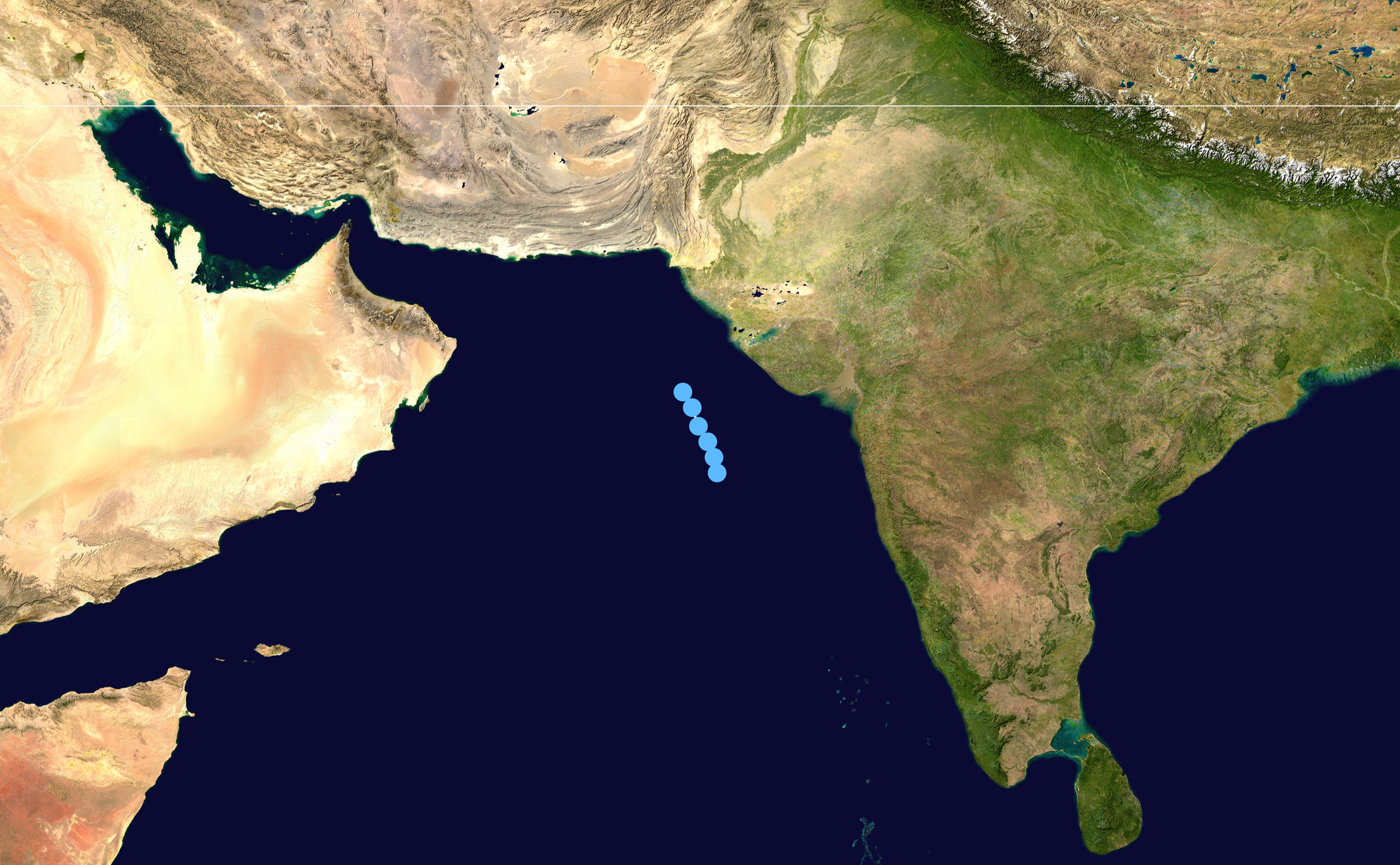
- Duration: June 11 – June 13
- Peak intensity: Winds not specified;

=== Depression Four ===
- Depression (IMD)
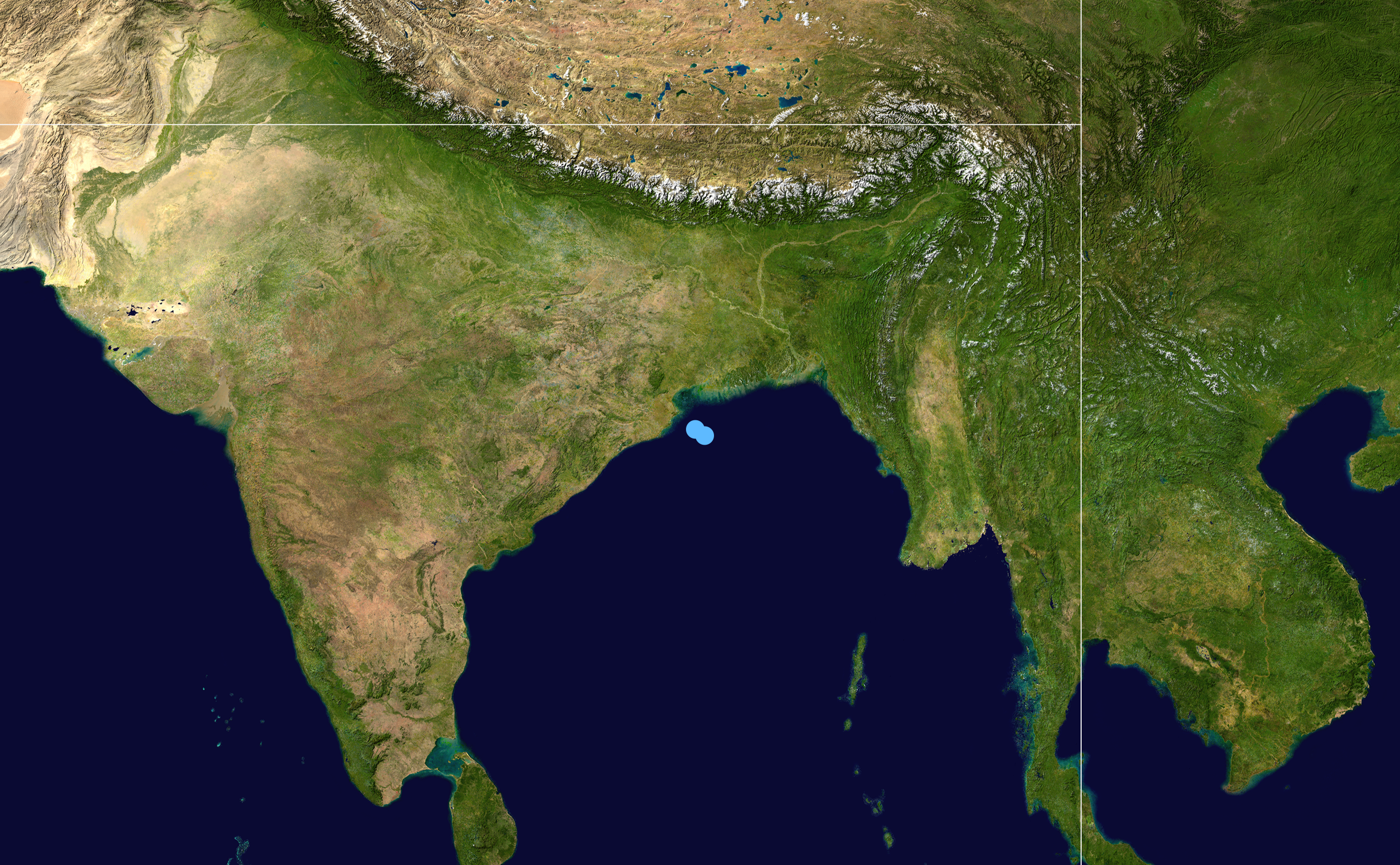
- Duration: June 26 – July 7
- Peak intensity: Winds not specified;

=== Depression Five ===
- Depression (IMD)
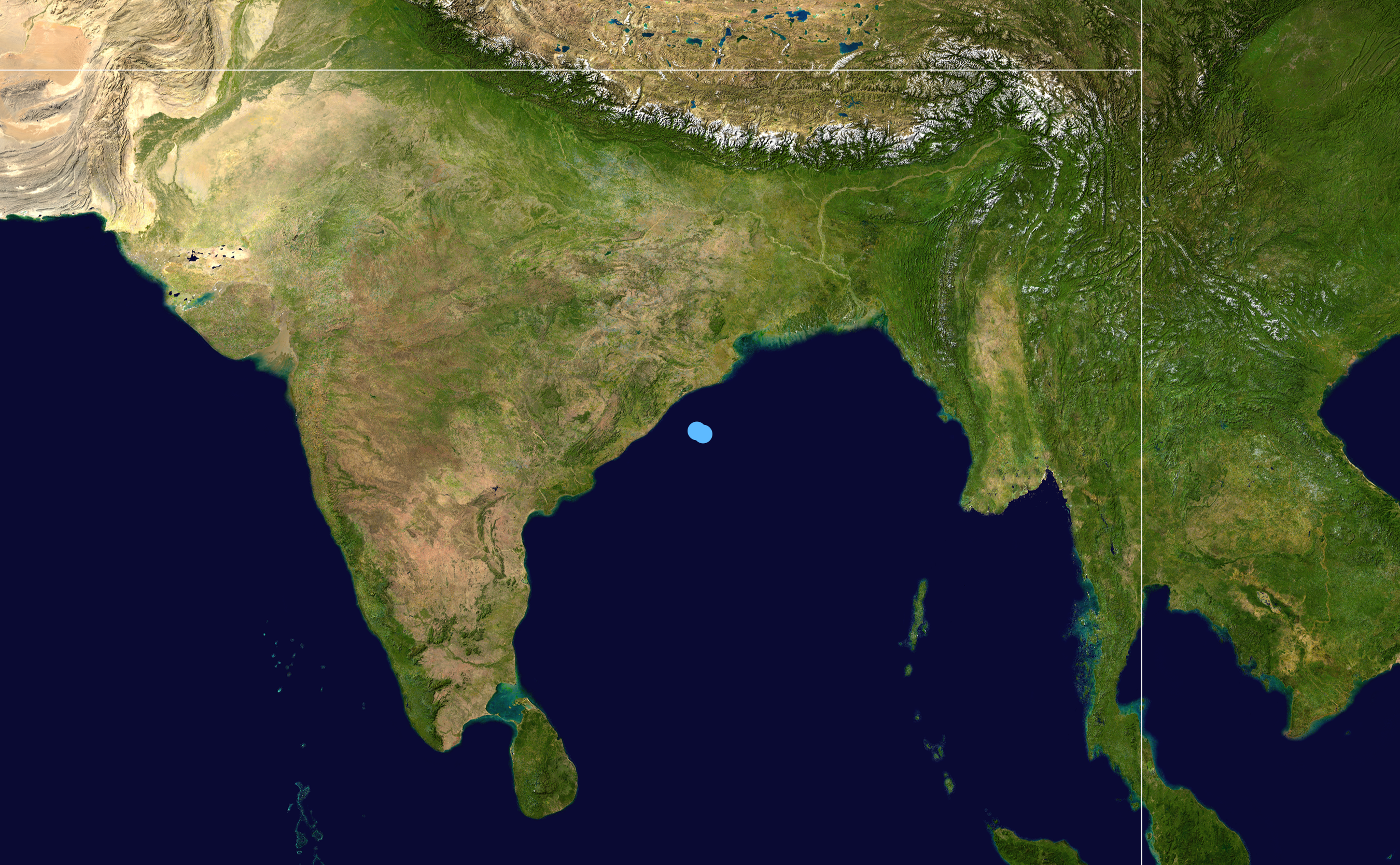
- Duration: July 19 – July 22
- Peak intensity: Winds not specified;

=== Cyclonic Storm Six ===
- Cyclonic storm (IMD)
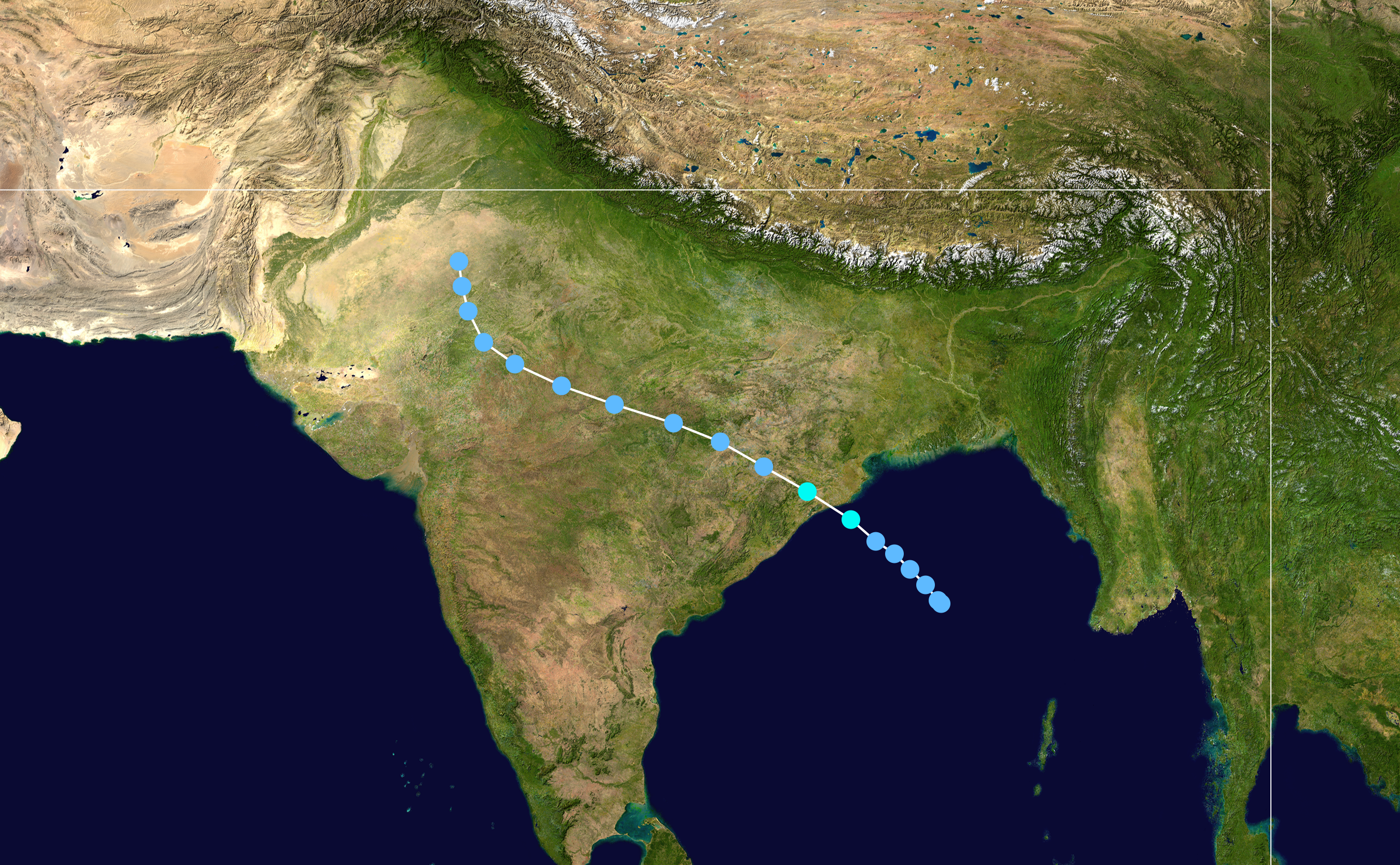
- Duration: July 24 – July 29
- Peak intensity: ≥85 km/h (55 mph) (3-min);

=== Depression Seven ===
- Depression (IMD)
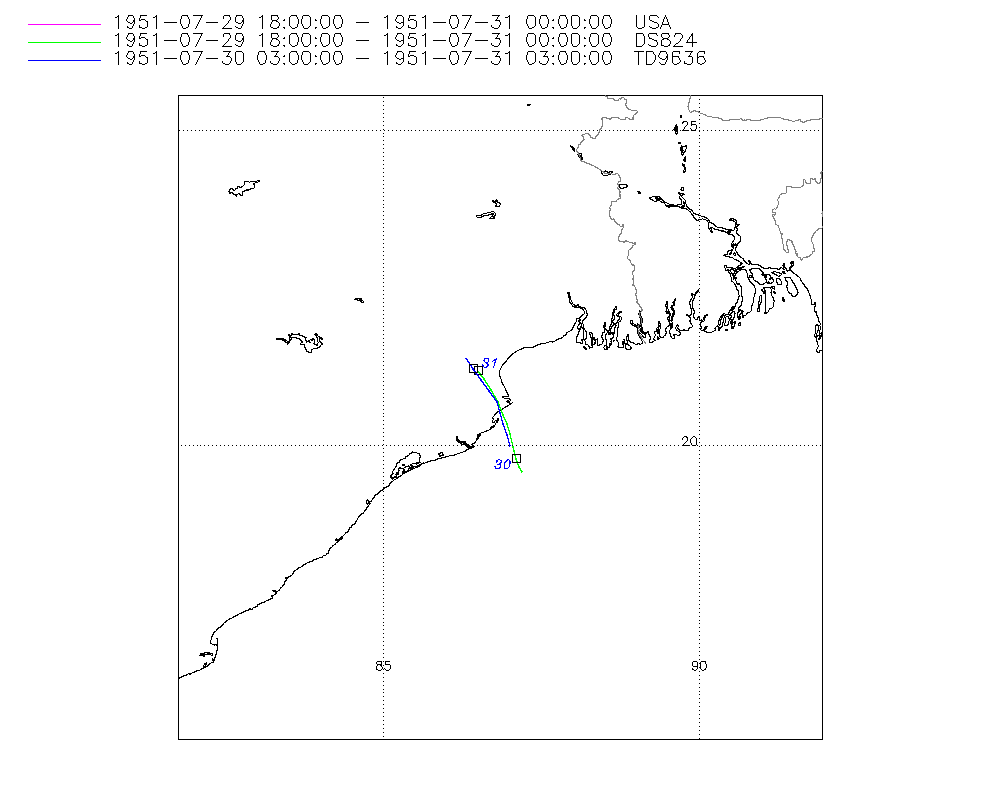
- Duration: July 30 – August 1
- Peak intensity: Winds not specified;

=== Depression Eight ===
- Depression (IMD)
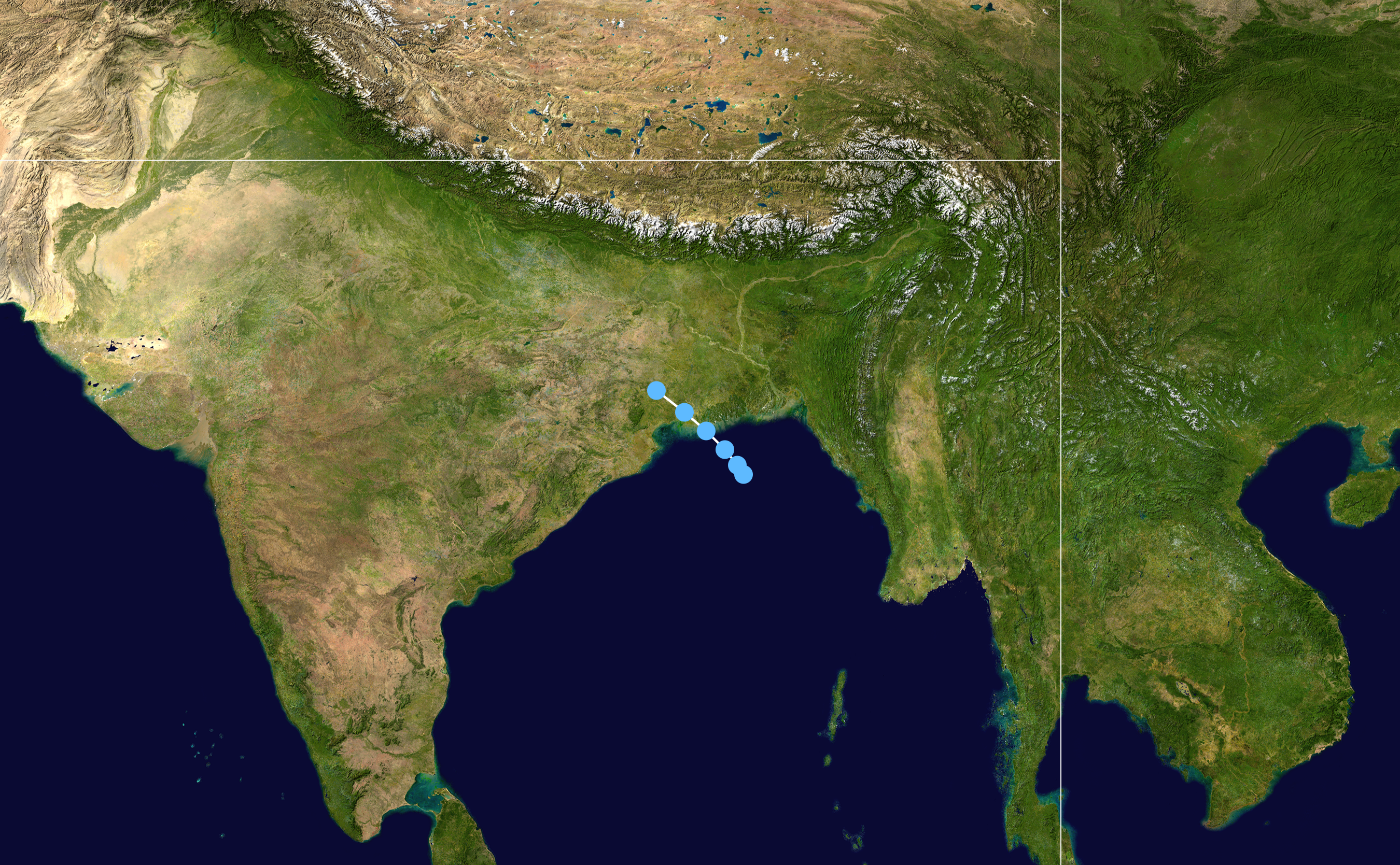
- Duration: August 4 – August 5
- Peak intensity: Winds not specified;

=== Depression Nine ===
- Depression (IMD)
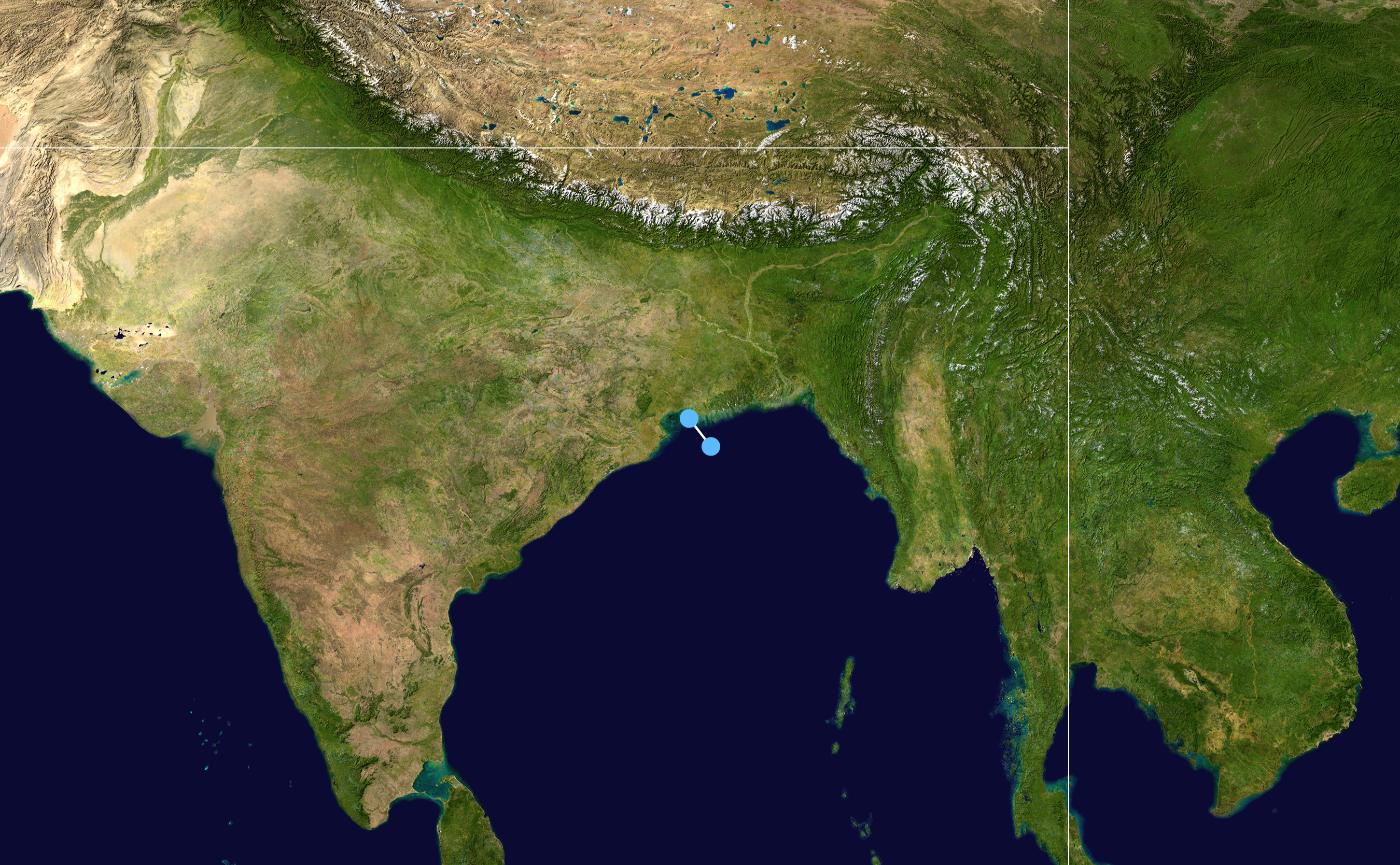
- Duration: August 16 – August 19
- Peak intensity: Winds not specified;

=== Depression Ten ===
- Depression (IMD)
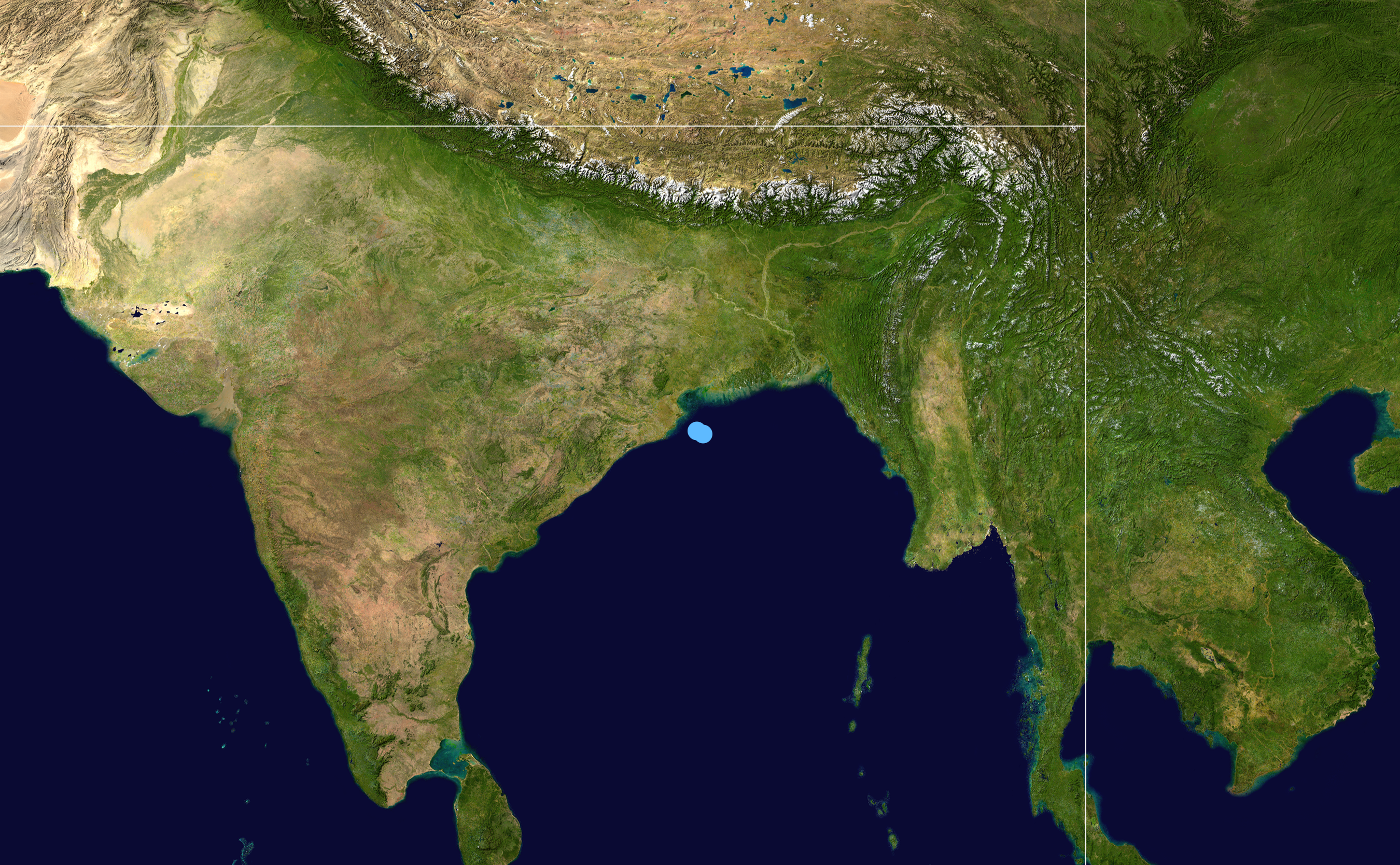
- Duration: August 30 – September 1
- Peak intensity: Winds not specified;

=== Land Depression Eleven ===
- Deep depression (IMD)
- Duration: September 9 – September 13
- Peak intensity: 55 km/h (35 mph) (3-min);

=== Depression Twelve ===
- Depression (IMD)
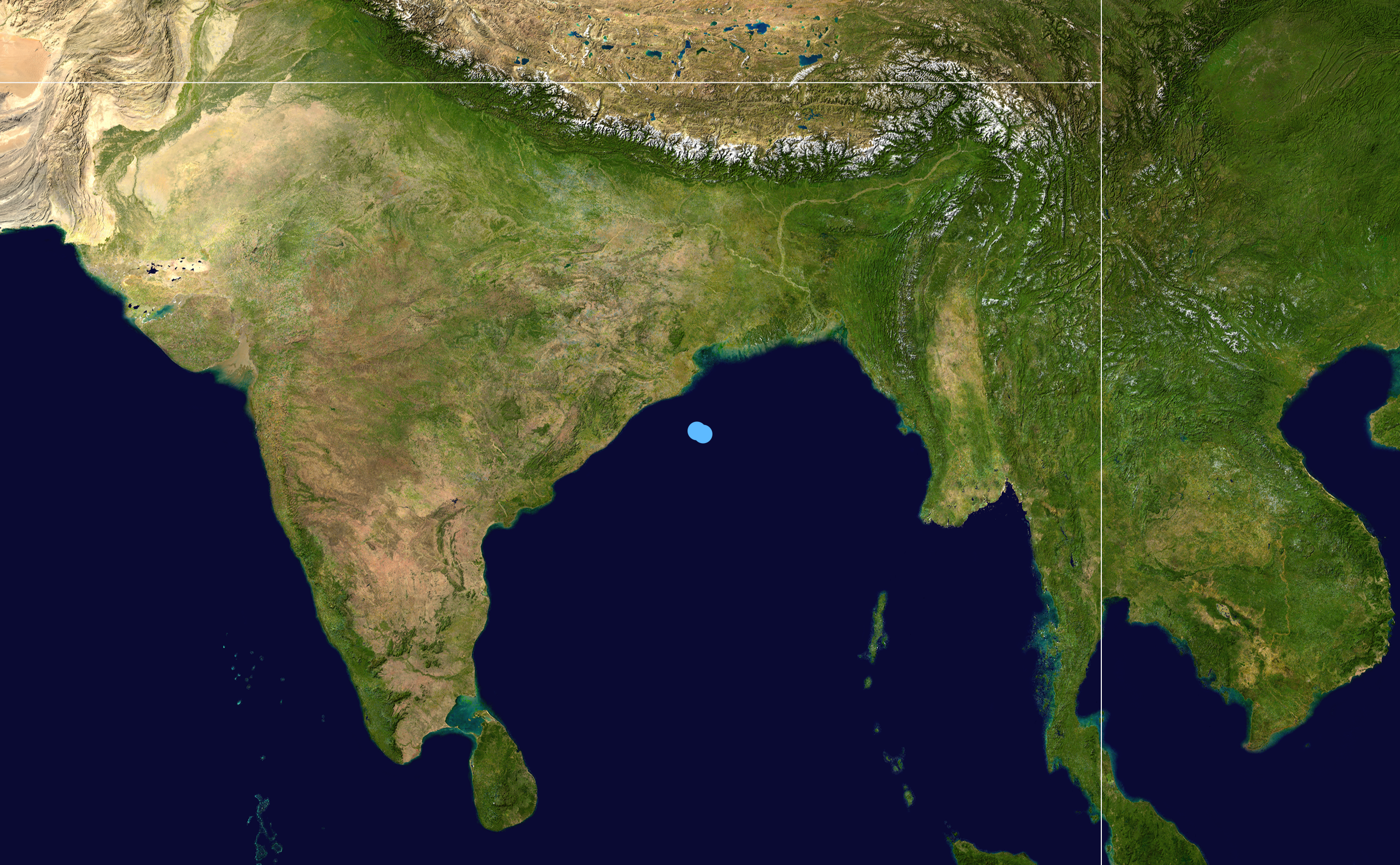
- Duration: October 11 – October 16
- Peak intensity: Winds not specified;

=== Severe Cyclonic Storm Thirteen ===
- Cyclonic storm (IMD)
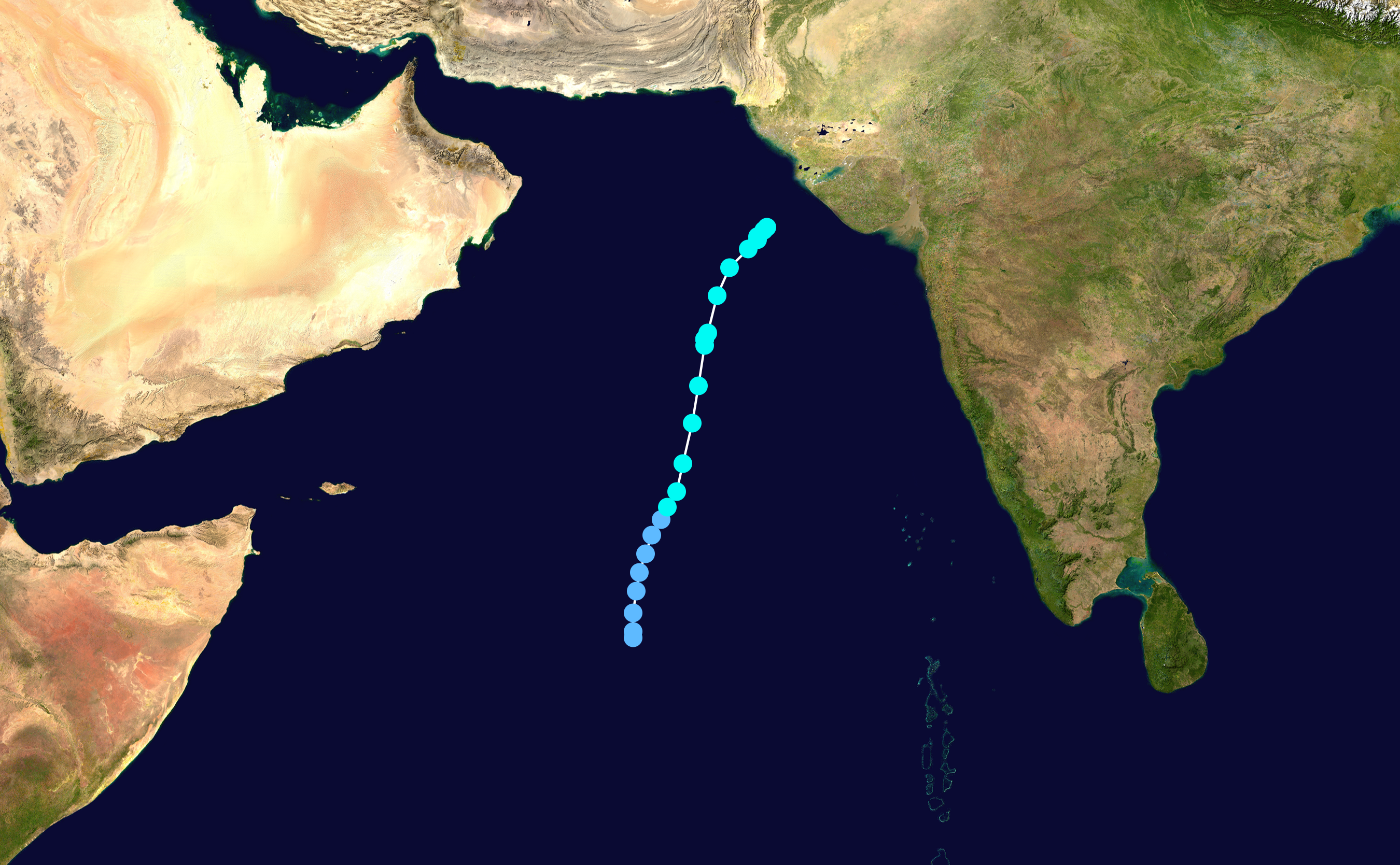
- Duration: November 12 – November 16
- Peak intensity: 80 km/h (50 mph) (3-min); 988.8 hPa (mbar)

=== Depression Fourteen ===
- Depression (IMD)
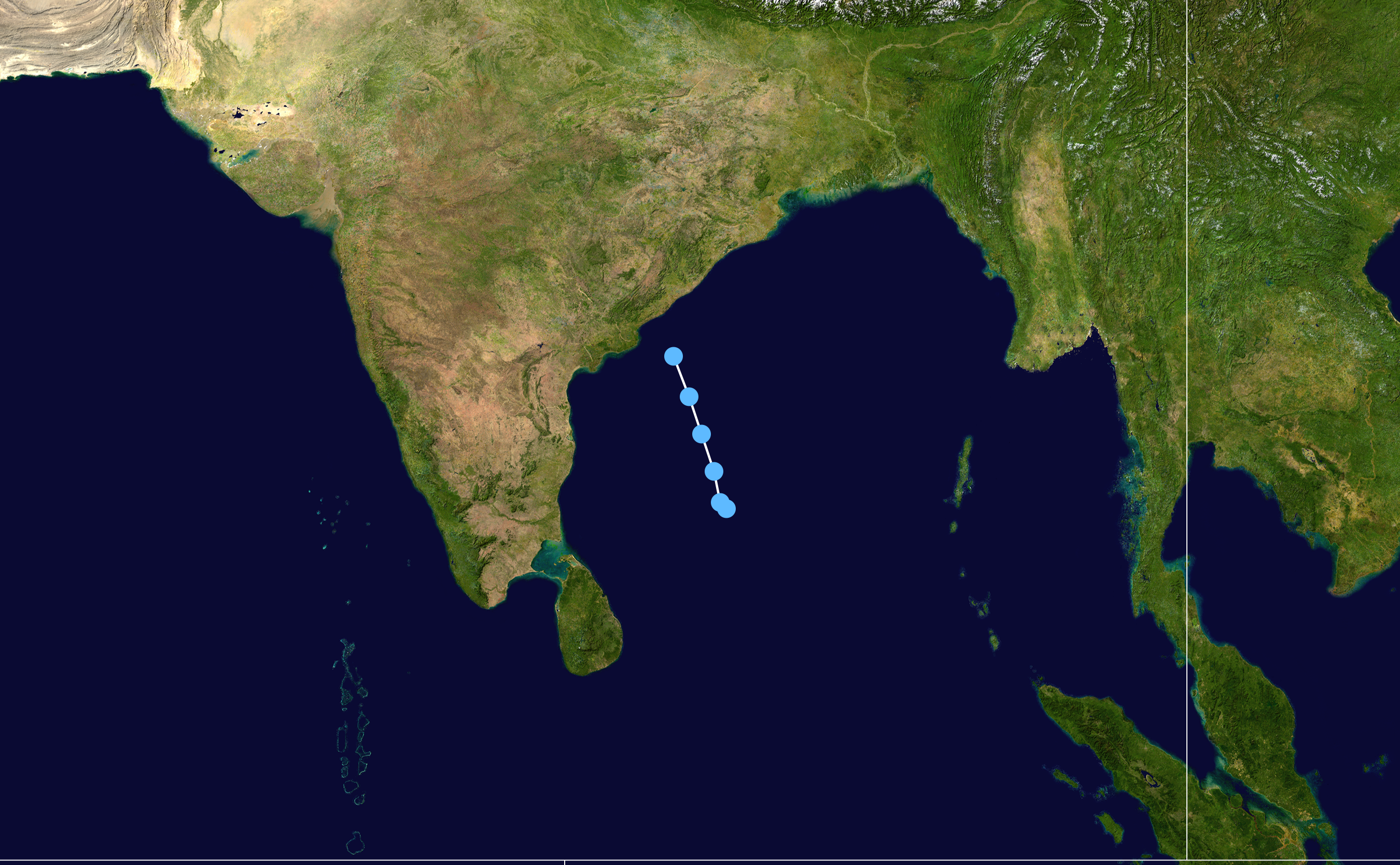
- Duration: November 23 – November 26
- Peak intensity: Winds not specified;

=== Severe Cyclonic Storm Fifteen ===
- Severe cyclonic storm (IMD)
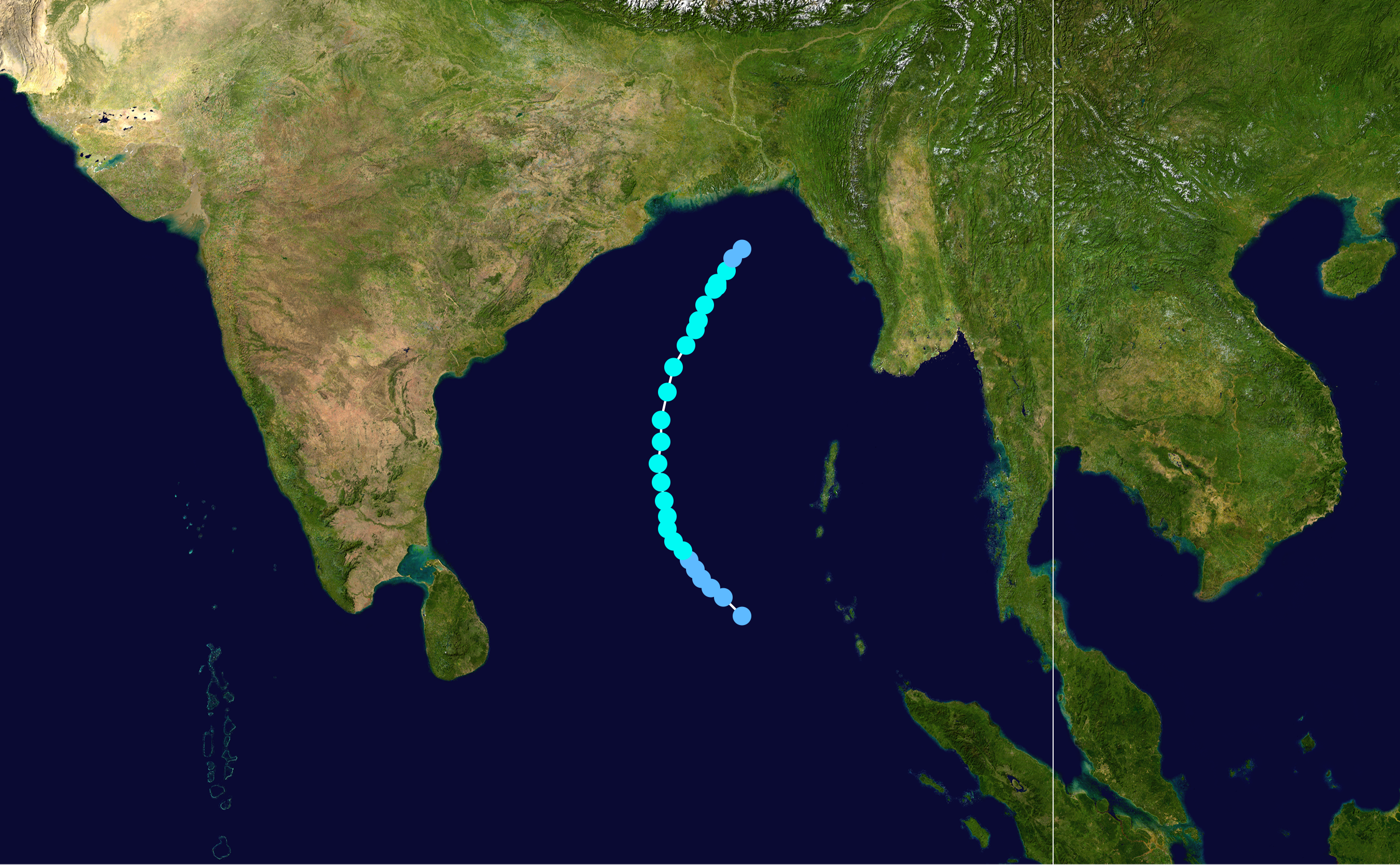
- Duration: December 5 – December 14
- Peak intensity: 95 km/h (60 mph) (3-min); 995 hPa (mbar)

== See also ==
- Australian region cyclone seasons: 1950–51 1951–52
- South Pacific cyclone seasons: 1950–51 1951–52
- South-West Indian Ocean cyclone seasons: 1950–51 1951–52
