= 1951 Pacific hurricane season =

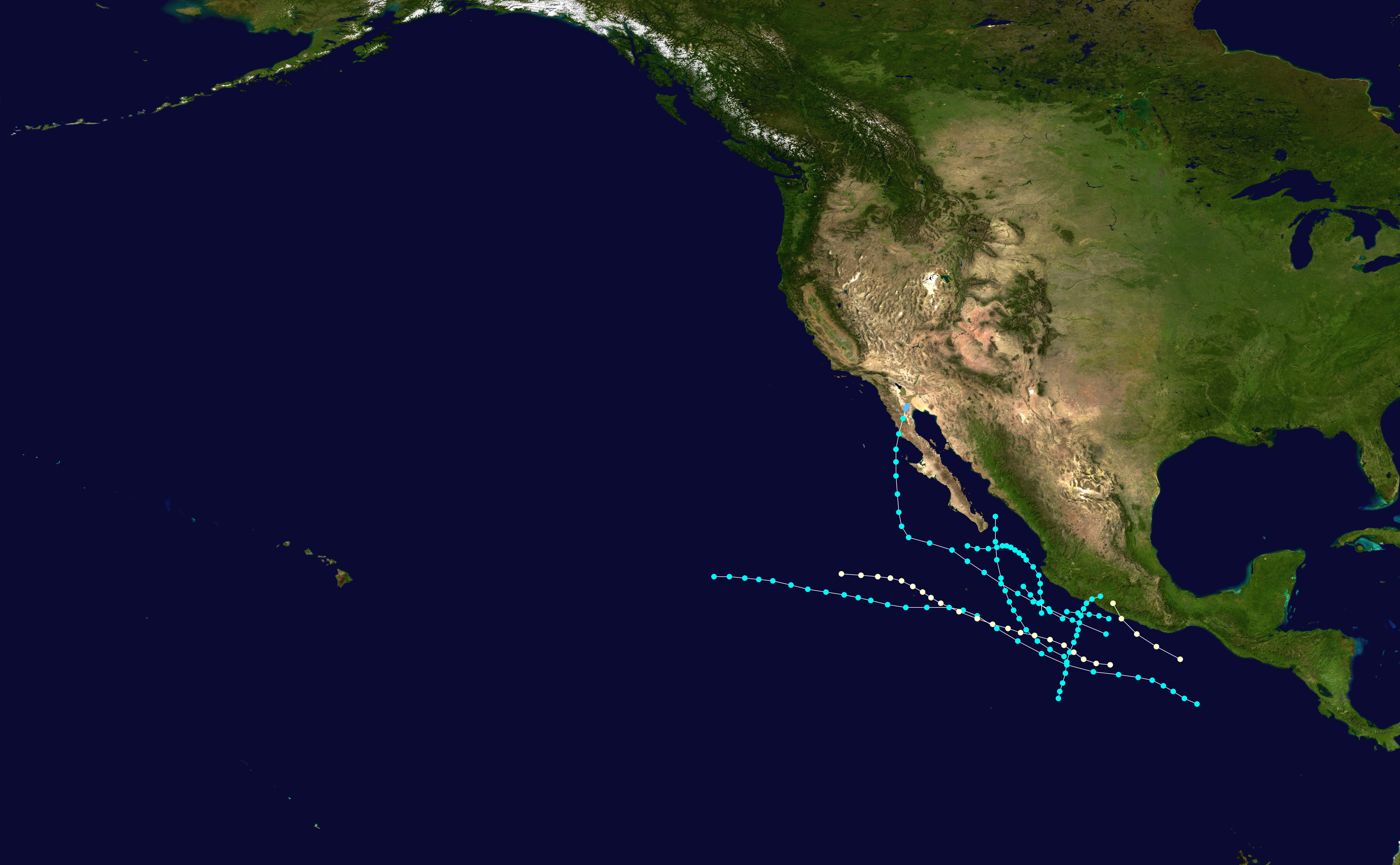
- Season summary map

Seasonal boundaries
- First system formed: May 17, 1951
- Last system dissipated: November 30, 1951

Strongest storm
- Name: Two and Eight
  - Maximum winds: 85 mph (140 km/h)

Seasonal statistics
- Total storms: 9 (10 unofficially)
- Hurricanes: 2
- Major hurricanes (Cat. 3+): 0
- Total fatalities: 0
- Total damage: Unknown

Related articles
- 1951 Atlantic hurricane season; 1951 Pacific typhoon season; 1951 North Indian Ocean cyclone season

The 1951 Pacific hurricane season ran through the summer and fall of 1951. Nine tropical systems were observed during the season.

== Systems ==
=== Tropical Storm One ===
- Tropical storm (SSHWS)
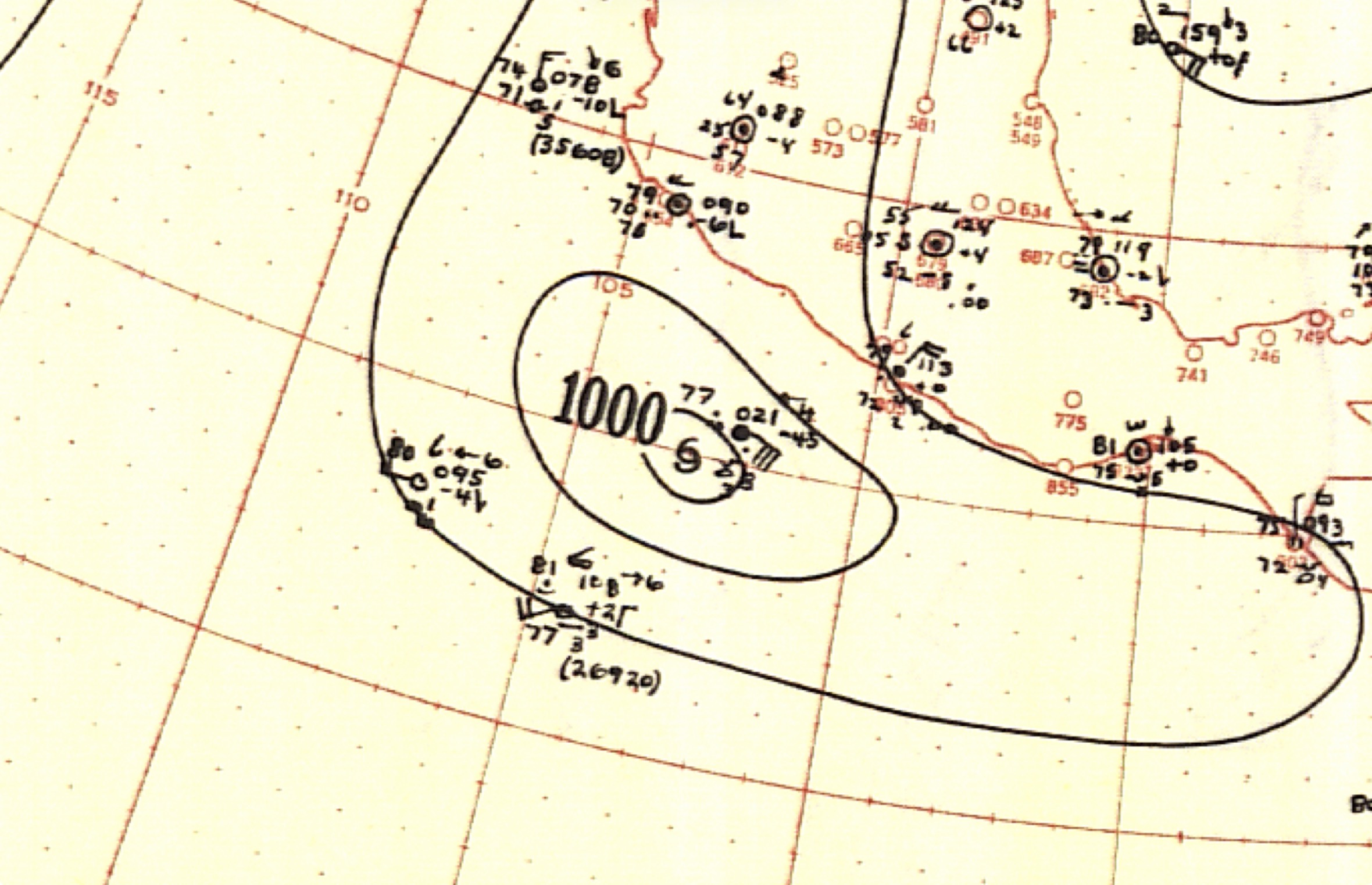
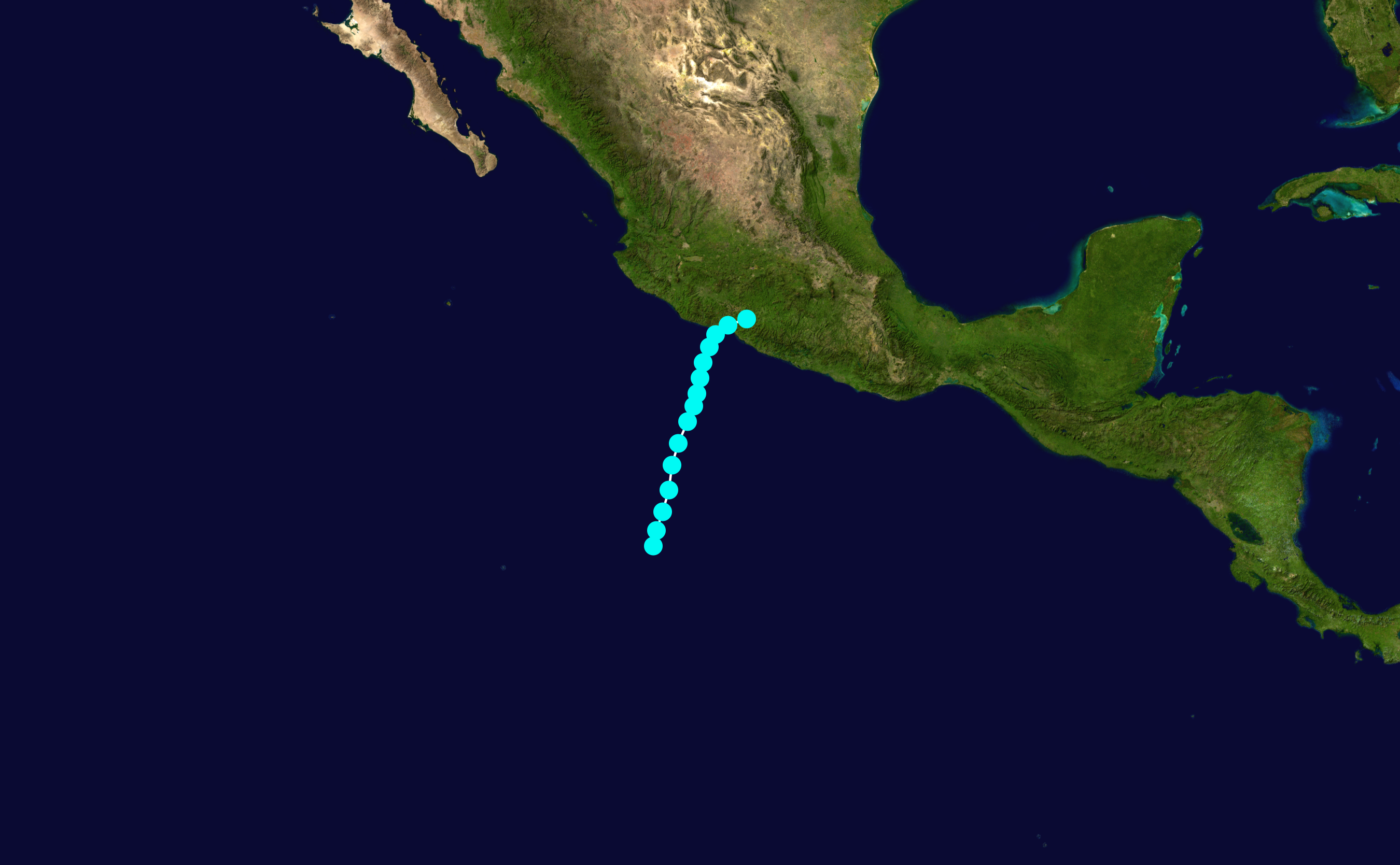
- Duration: May 17 – May 21
- Peak intensity: 50 mph (85 km/h) (1-min);

A tropical storm hit near Acapulco early in the season in May.

=== Hurricane Two ===
- Category 1 hurricane (SSHWS)
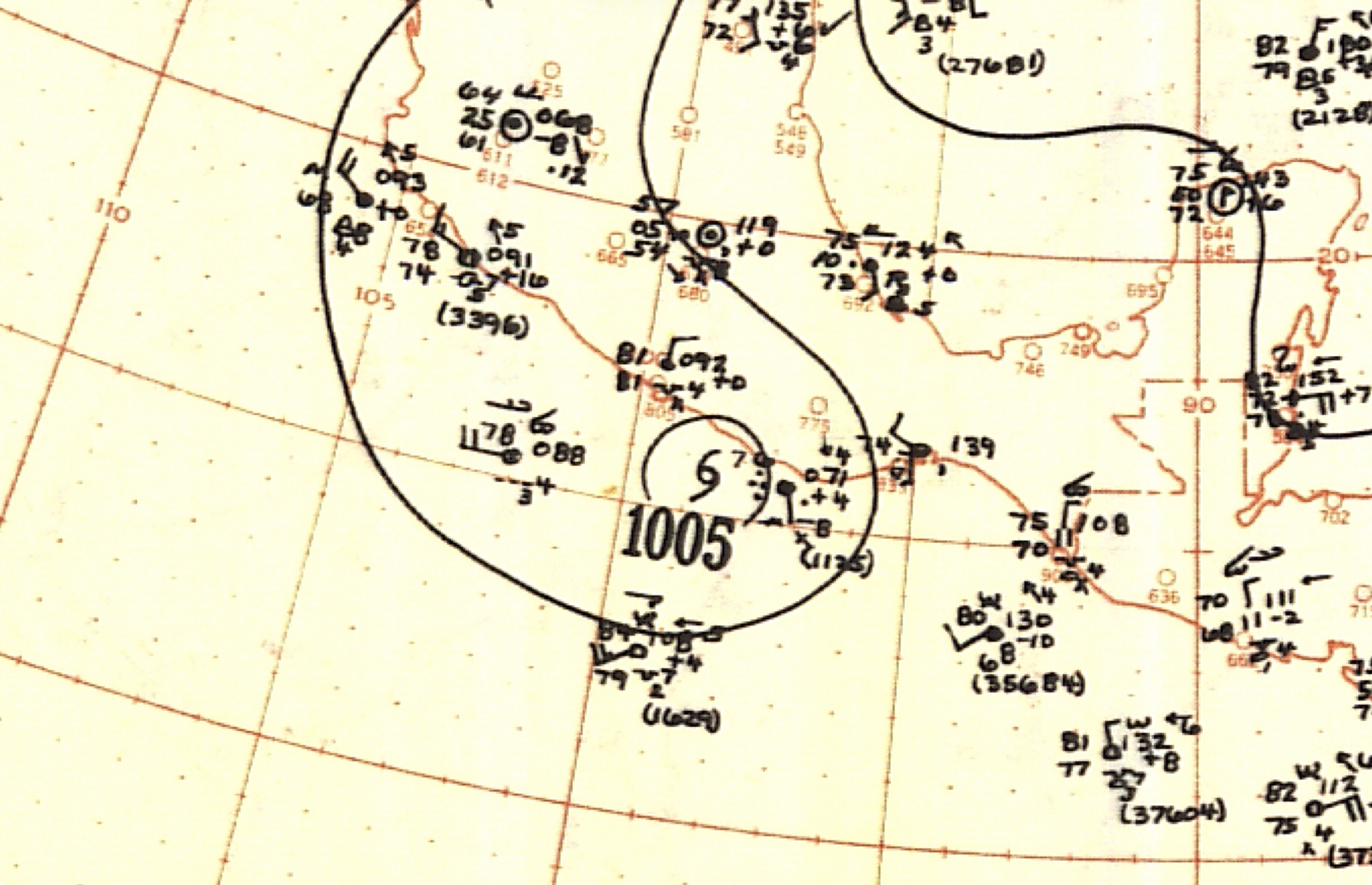
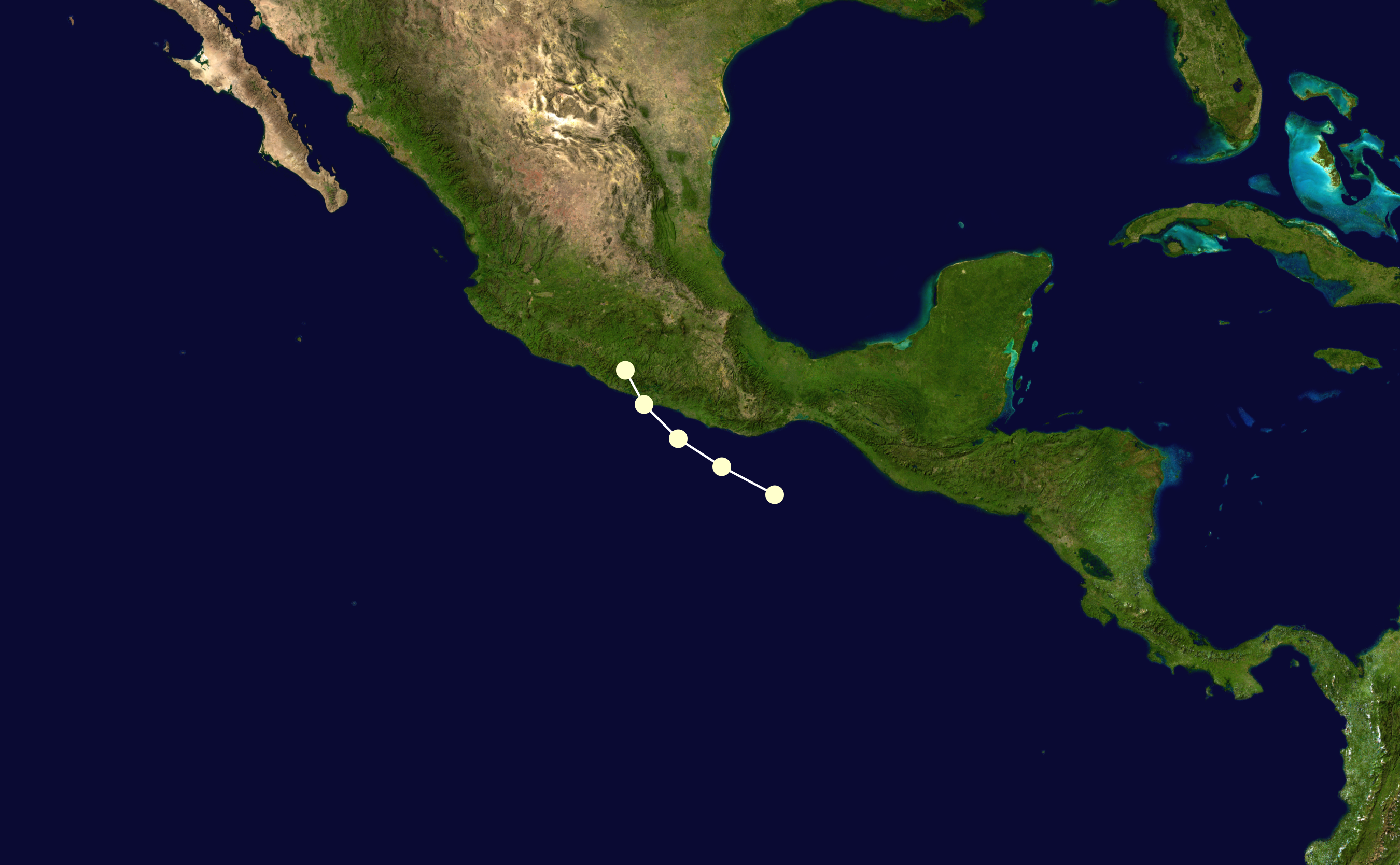
- Duration: June 1 – June 2
- Peak intensity: 85 mph (140 km/h) (1-min);

A hurricane hit near Acapulco early in the season in June.

=== Tropical Storm Three ===
- Tropical storm (SSHWS)
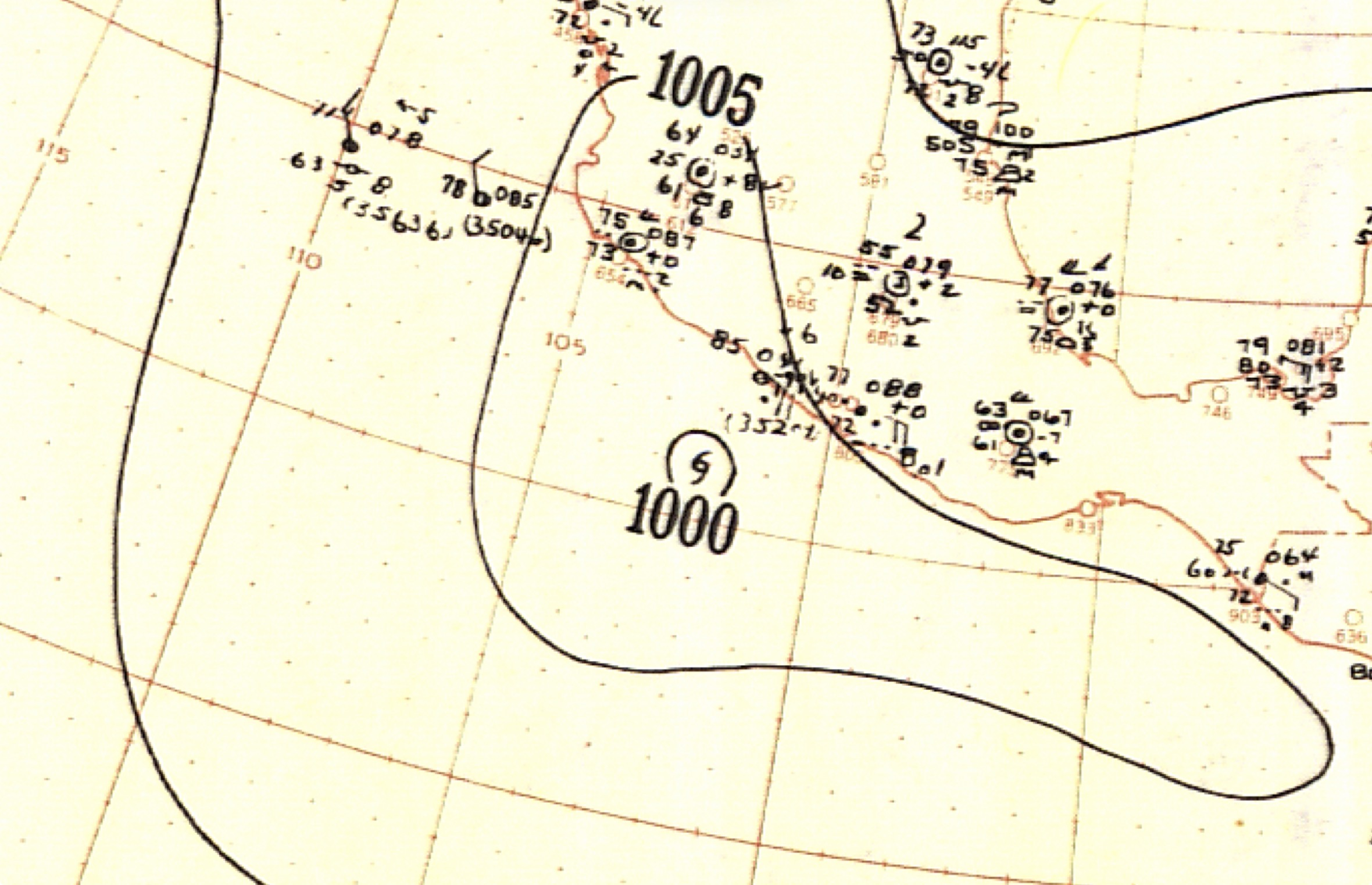
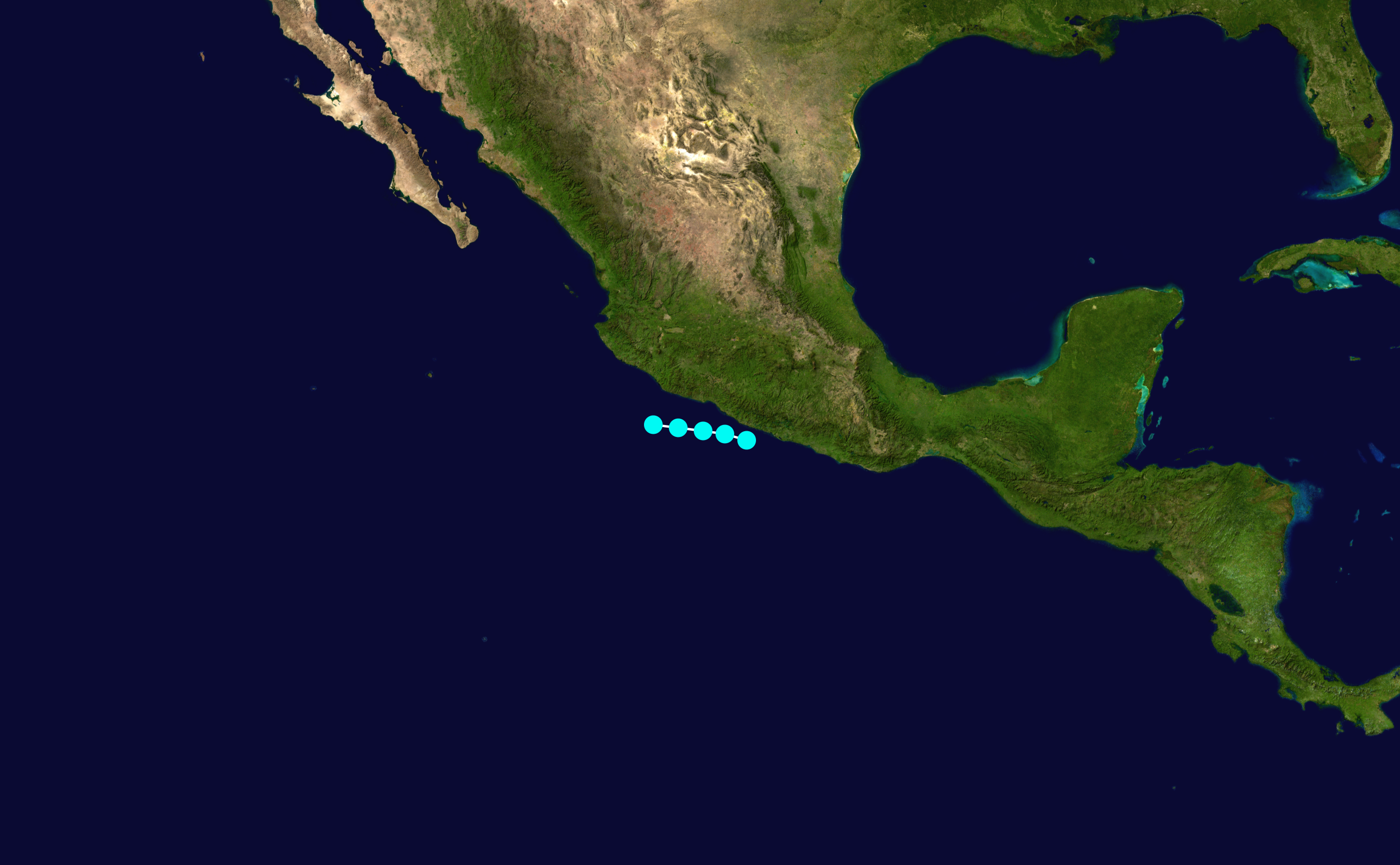
- Duration: June 26 – June 27
- Peak intensity: 50 mph (85 km/h) (1-min);

Three came close to land.

=== Tropical Storm Four ===
- Tropical storm (SSHWS)
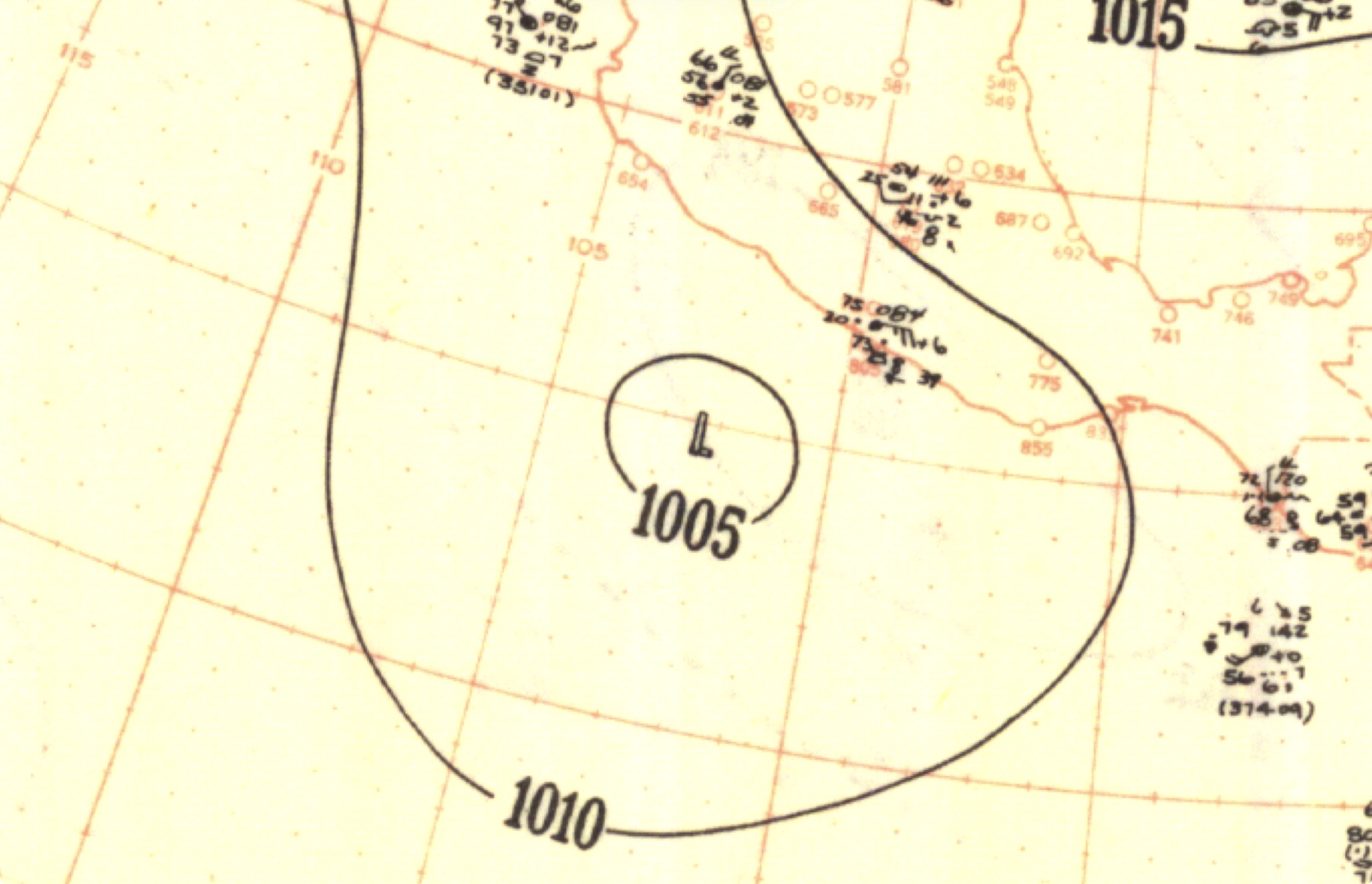
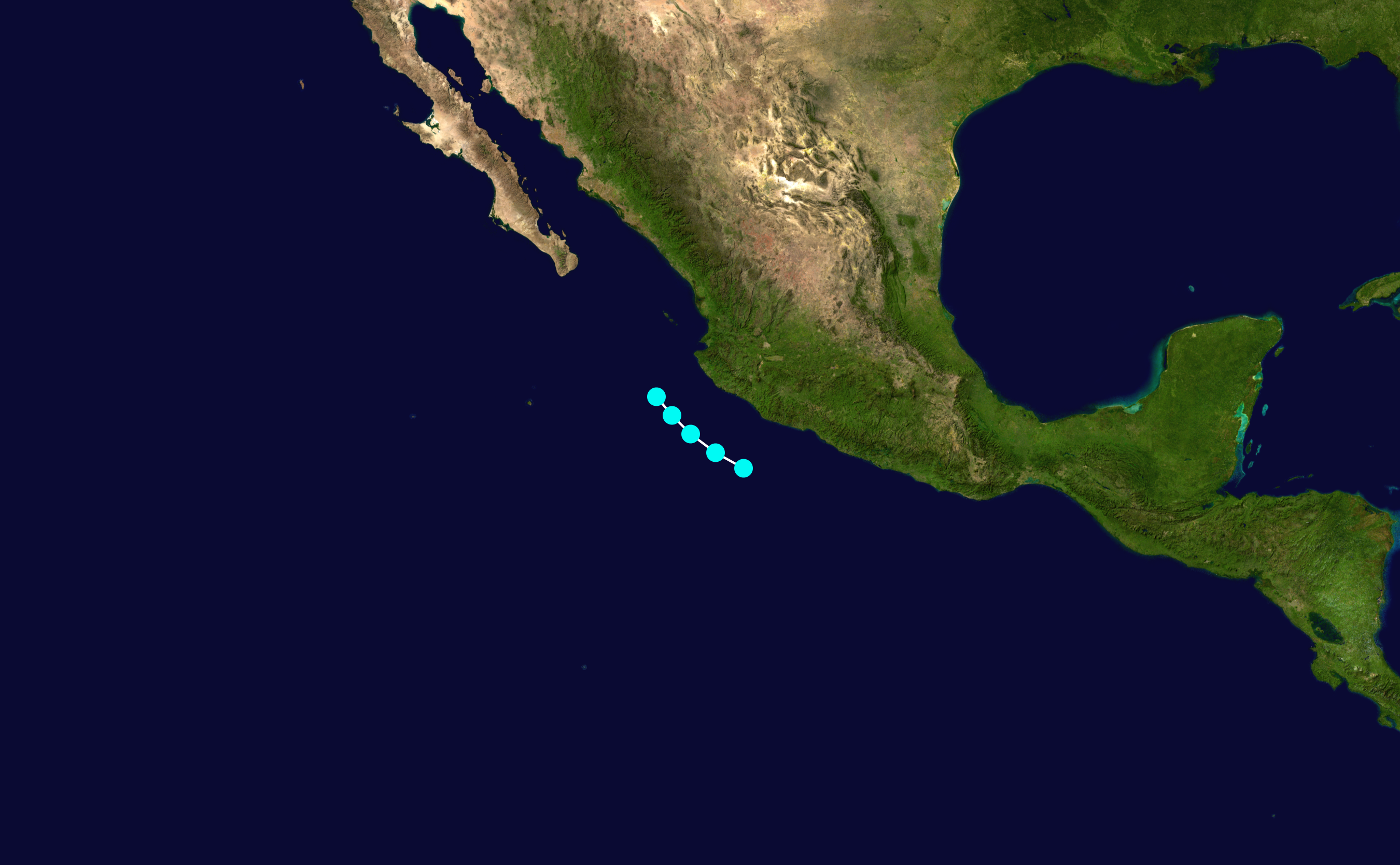
- Duration: July 5 – July 6
- Peak intensity: 50 mph (85 km/h) (1-min);

Tropical Storm Four existed from July 5 to July 6.

=== Tropical Storm Five ===
- Tropical storm (SSHWS)
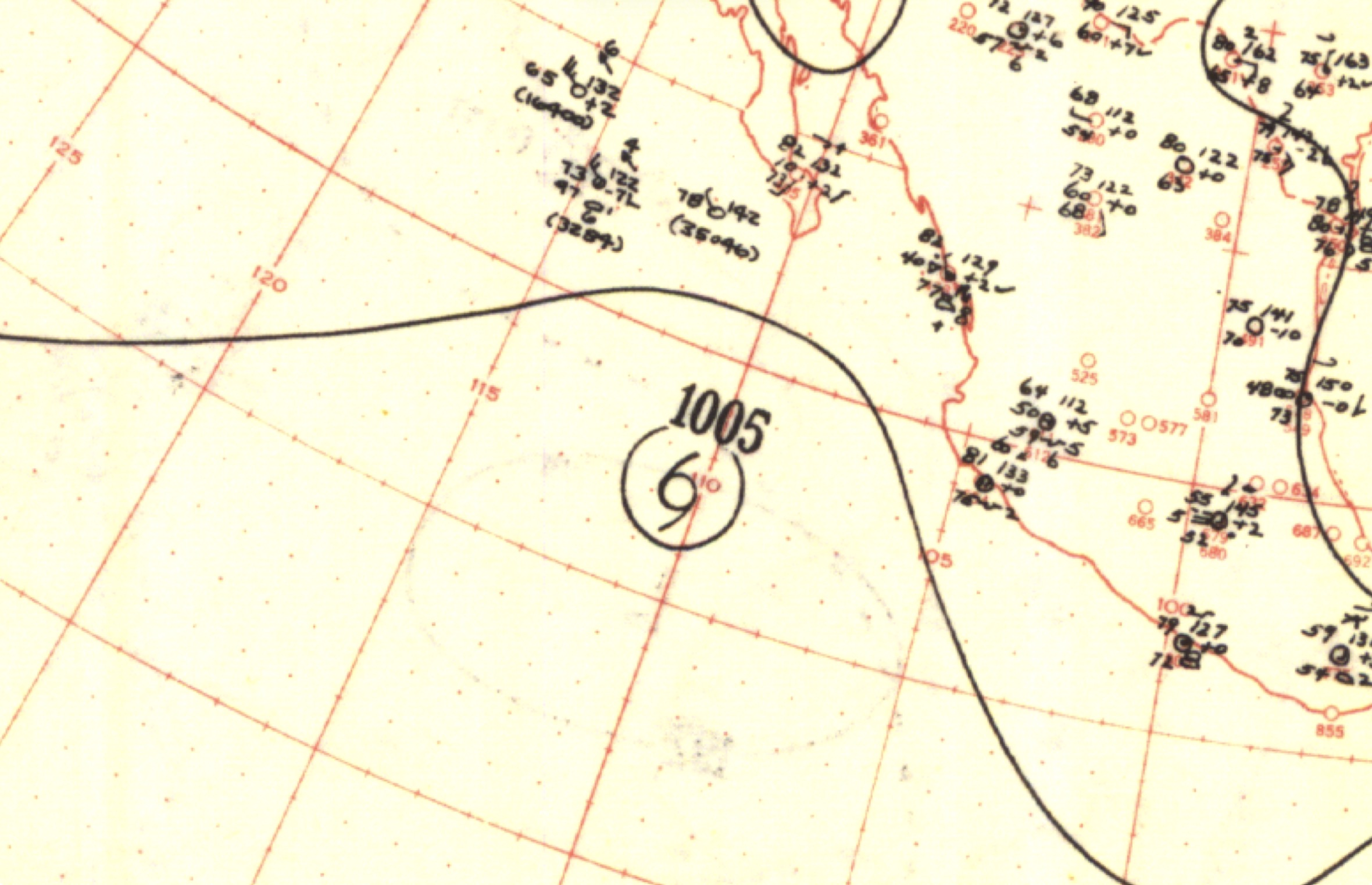
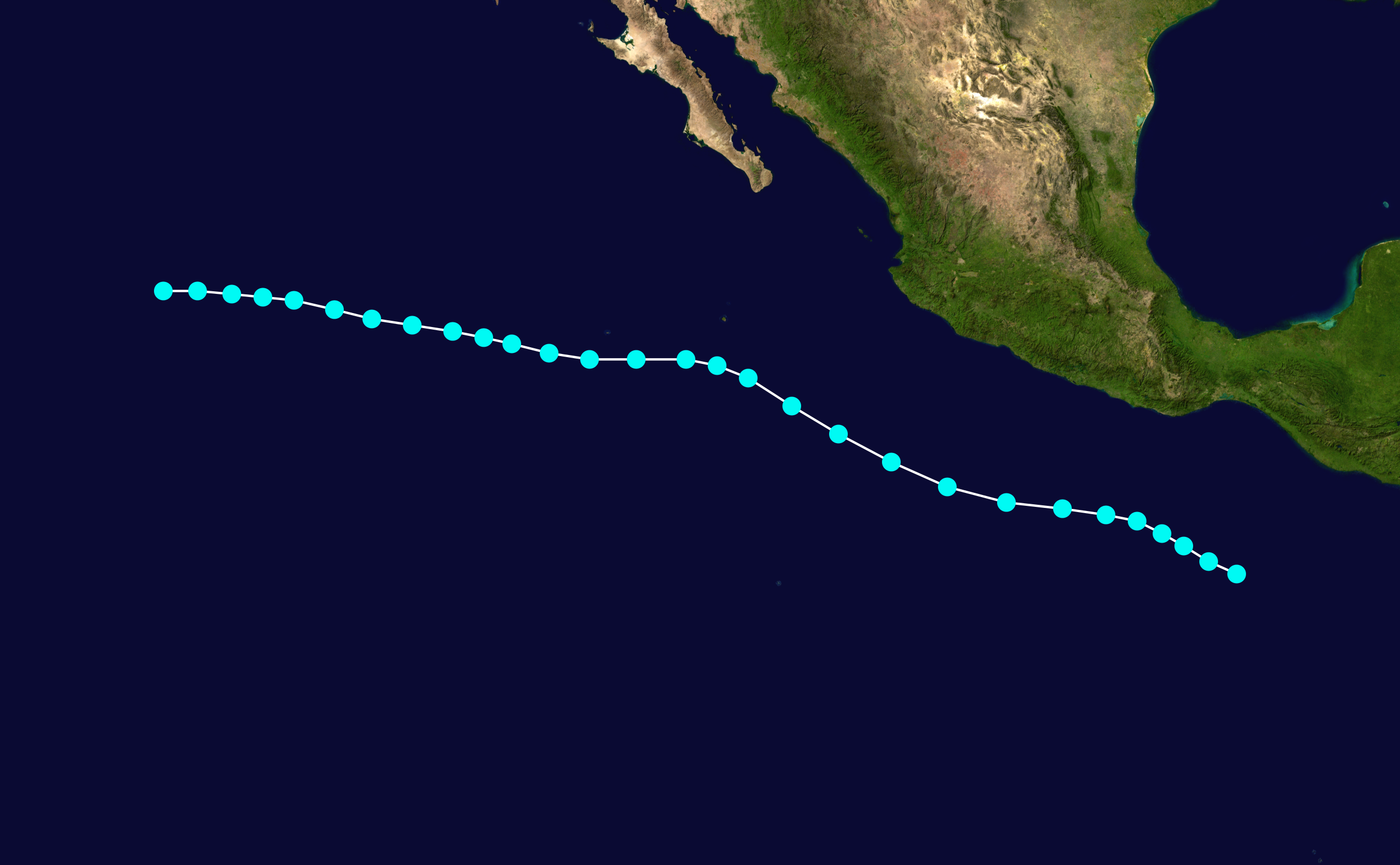
- Duration: August 3 – August 10
- Peak intensity: 50 mph (85 km/h) (1-min);

Tropical Storm Five existed from August 3 to August 10.

=== Tropical Storm Six ===
- Tropical storm (SSHWS)
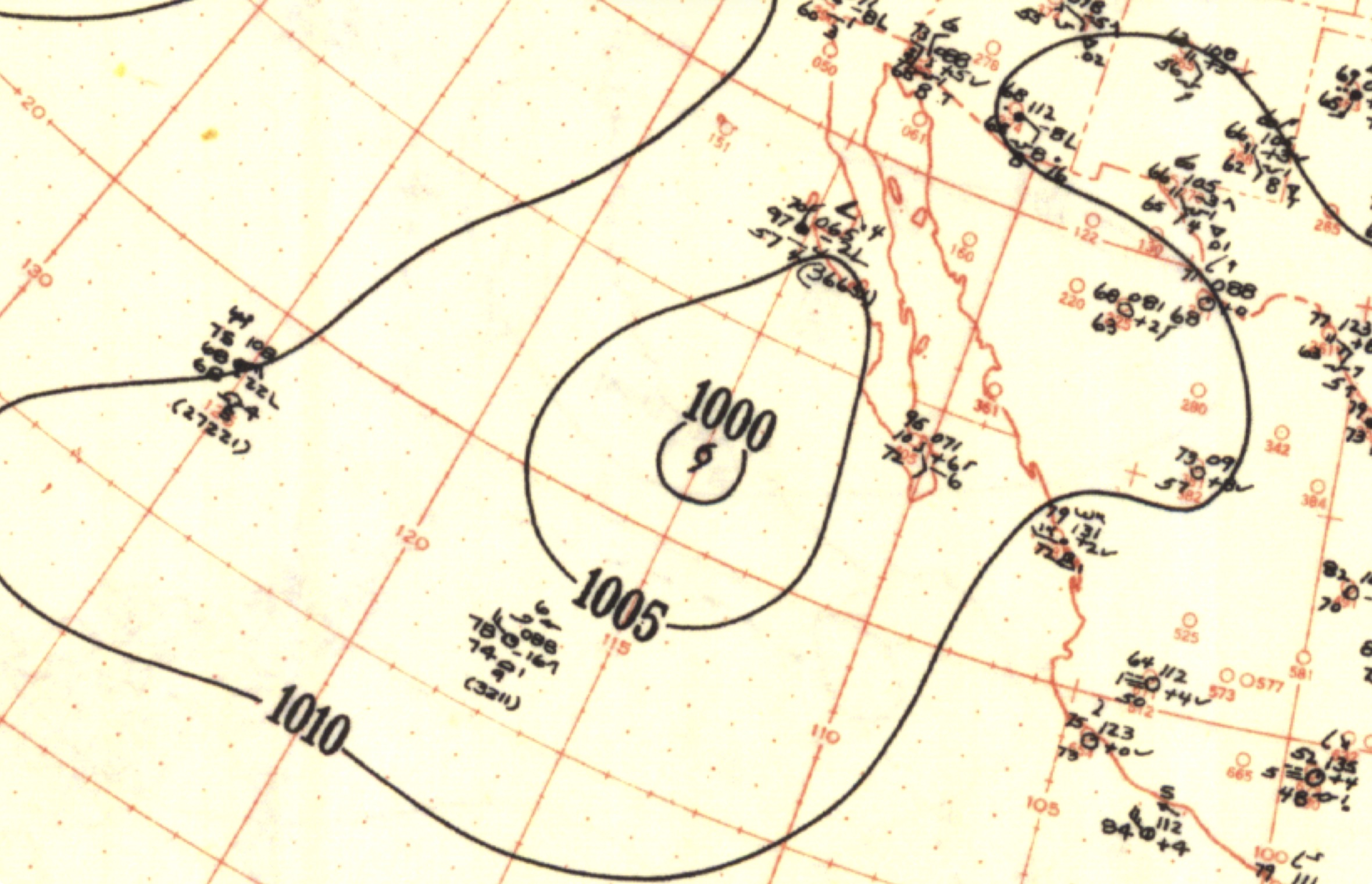
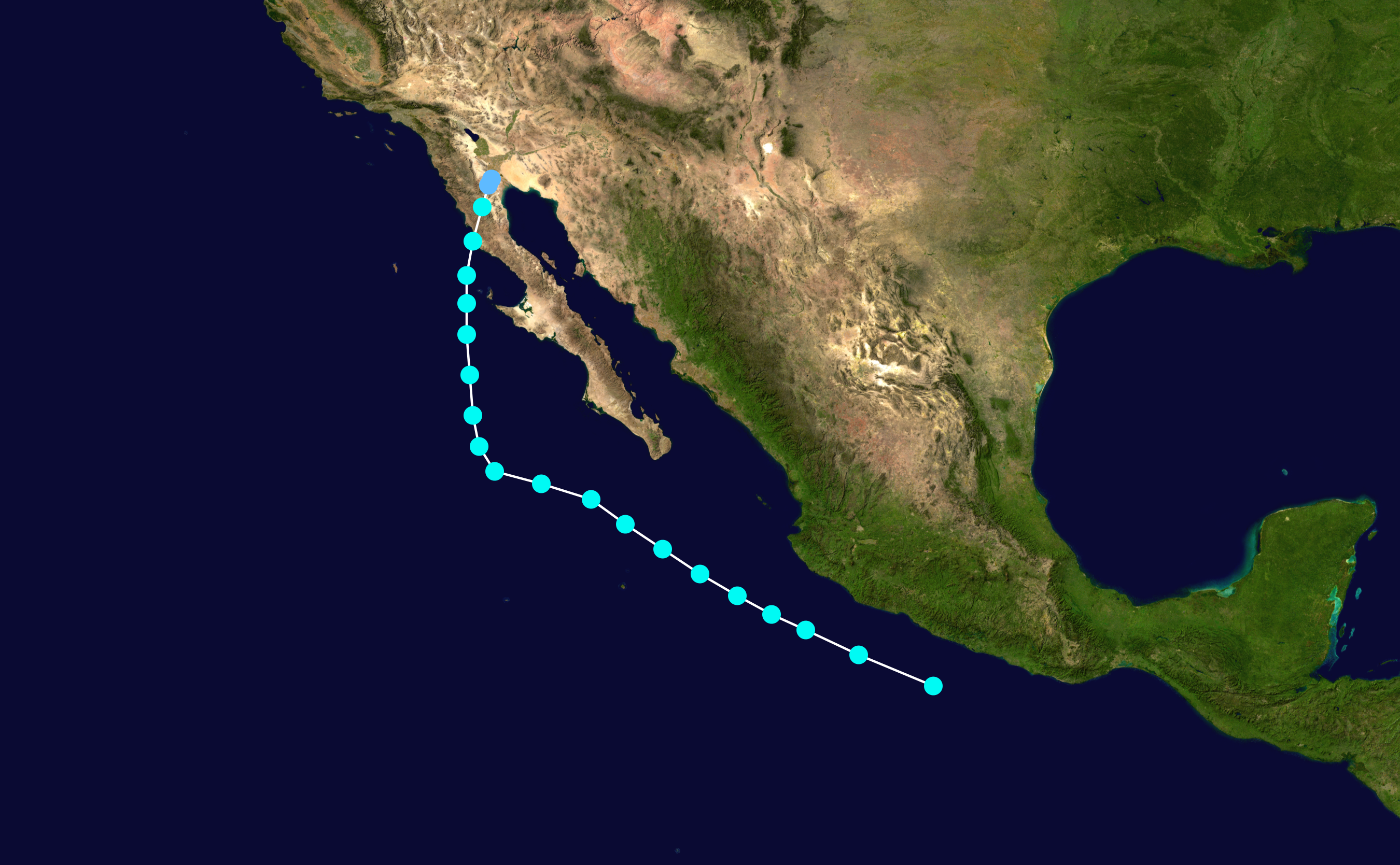
- Duration: August 24 – August 29
- Peak intensity: 50 mph (85 km/h) (1-min);

On August 24, a tropical storm was first observed south of Mexico. It paralleled the coastline, and moved northward into Baja California on the 28th. It dissipated the next day, and caused moderate flooding in southern California.

=== Tropical Storm Seven ===
- Tropical storm (SSHWS)
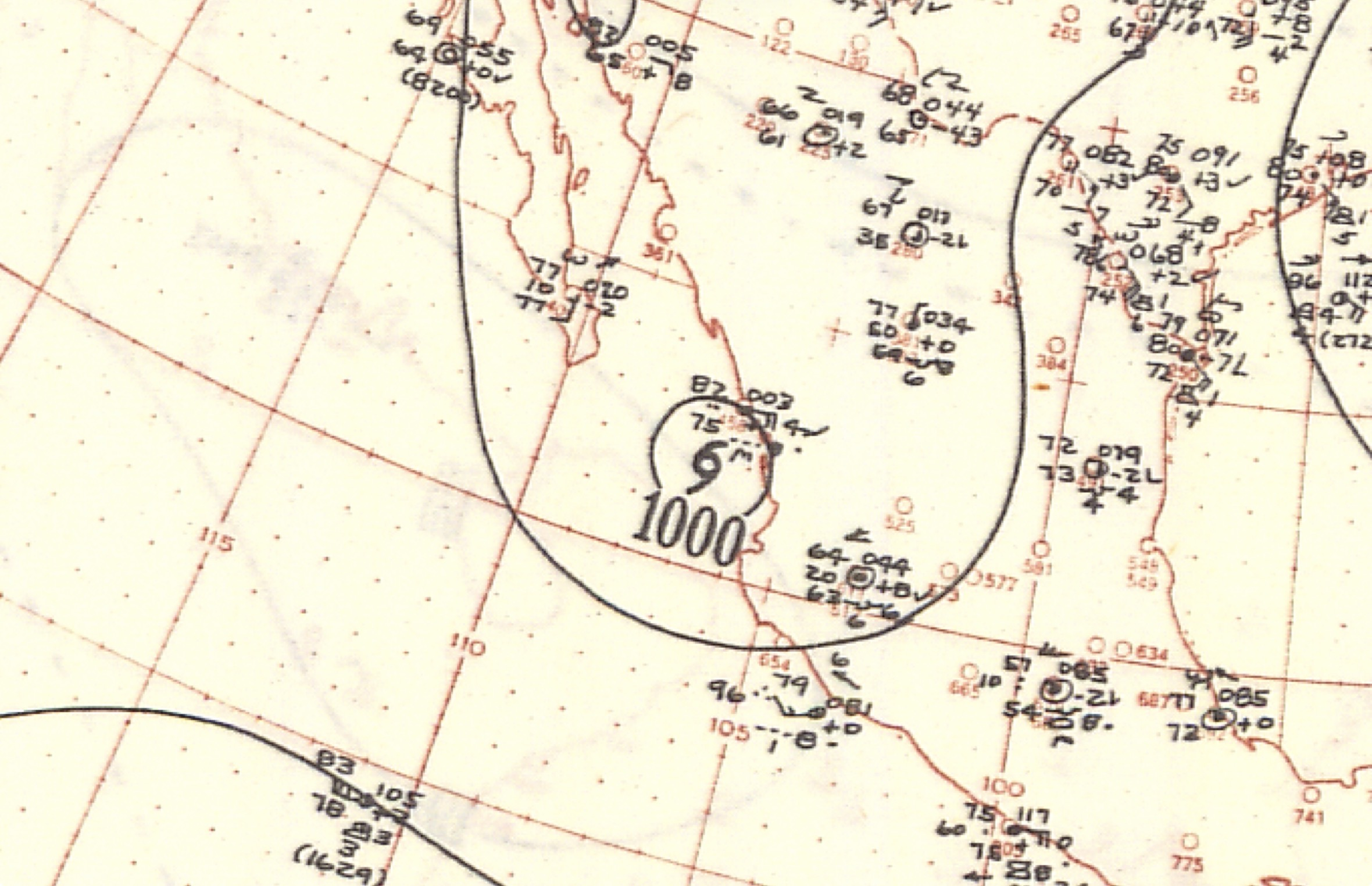
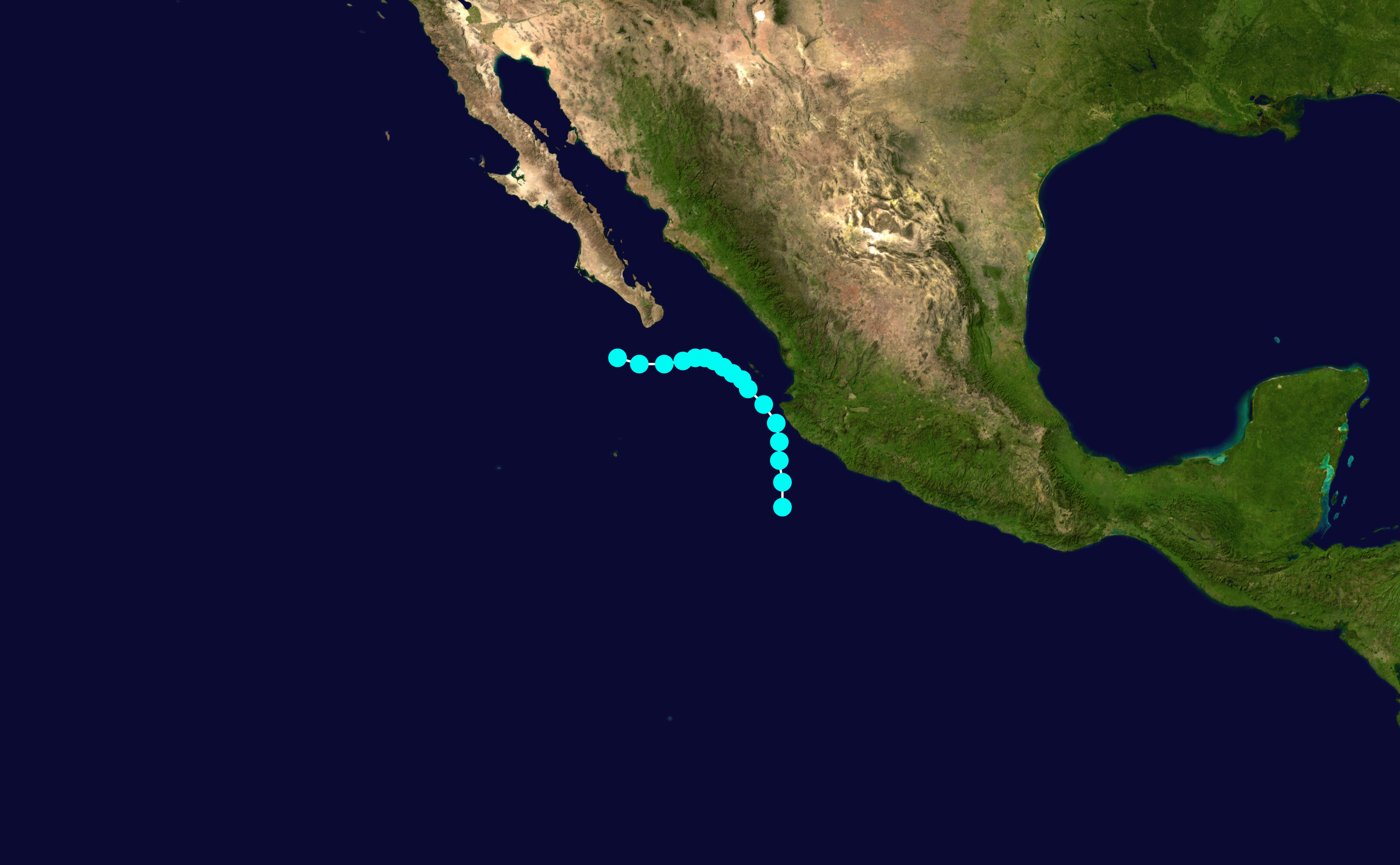
- Duration: September 11 – September 15
- Peak intensity: 50 mph (85 km/h) (1-min);

Tropical Storm Seven existed from September 11 to September 15.

=== Hurricane Eight ===
- Category 1 hurricane (SSHWS)
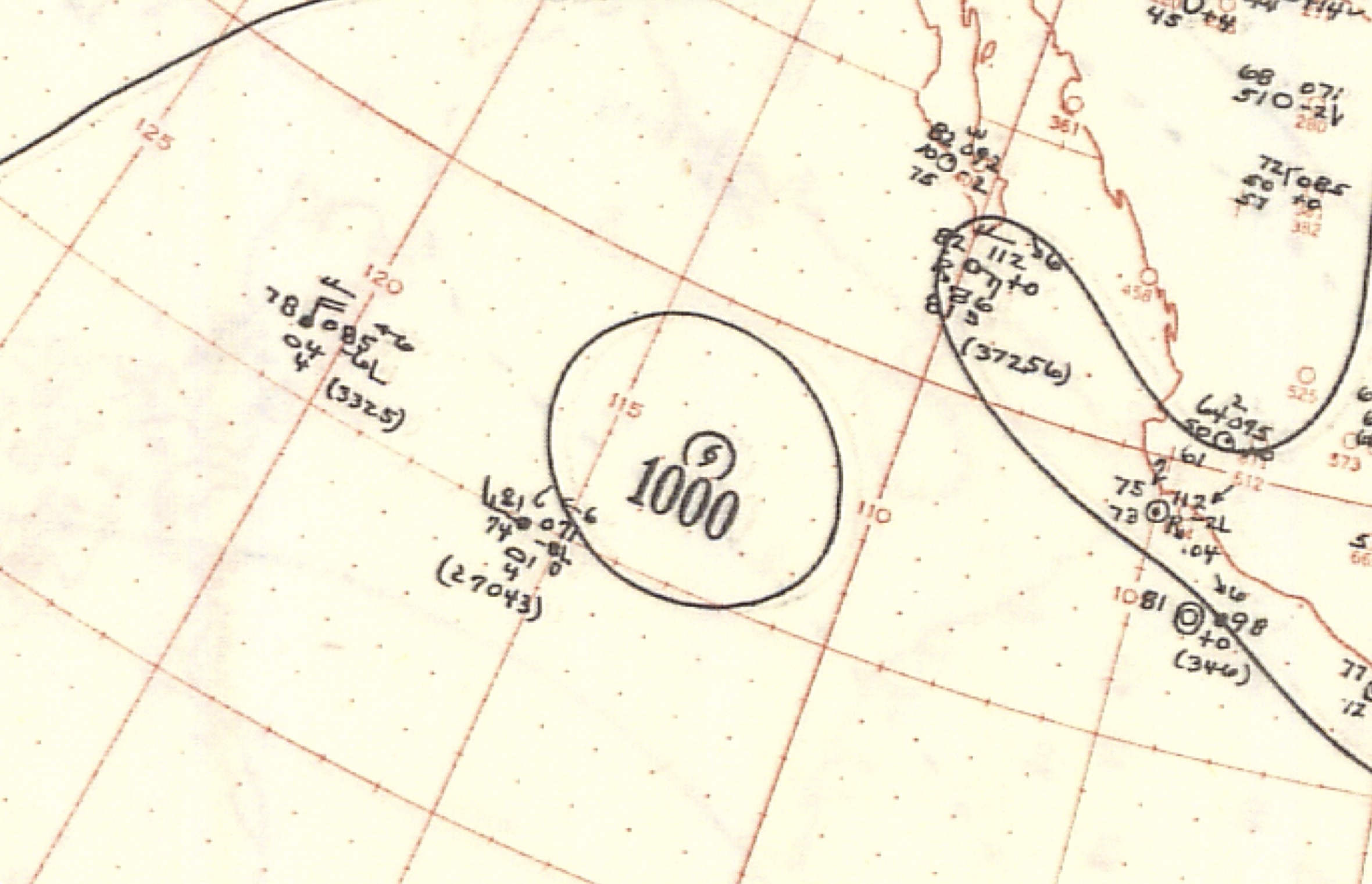
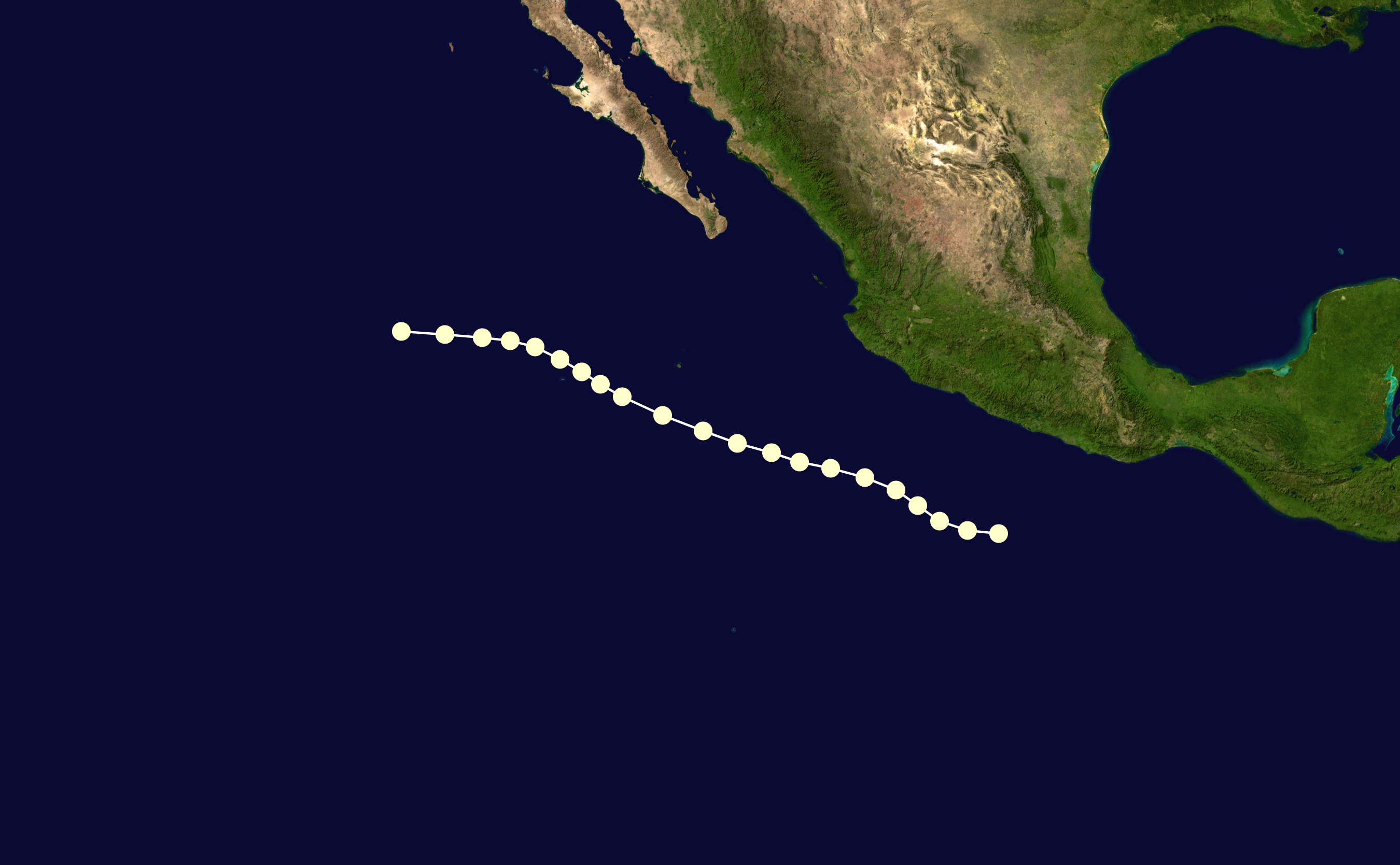
- Duration: September 23 – September 28
- Peak intensity: 85 mph (140 km/h) (1-min);

Hurricane Eight existed from September 23 to September 28.

=== Tropical Storm Nine ===
- Tropical storm (SSHWS)
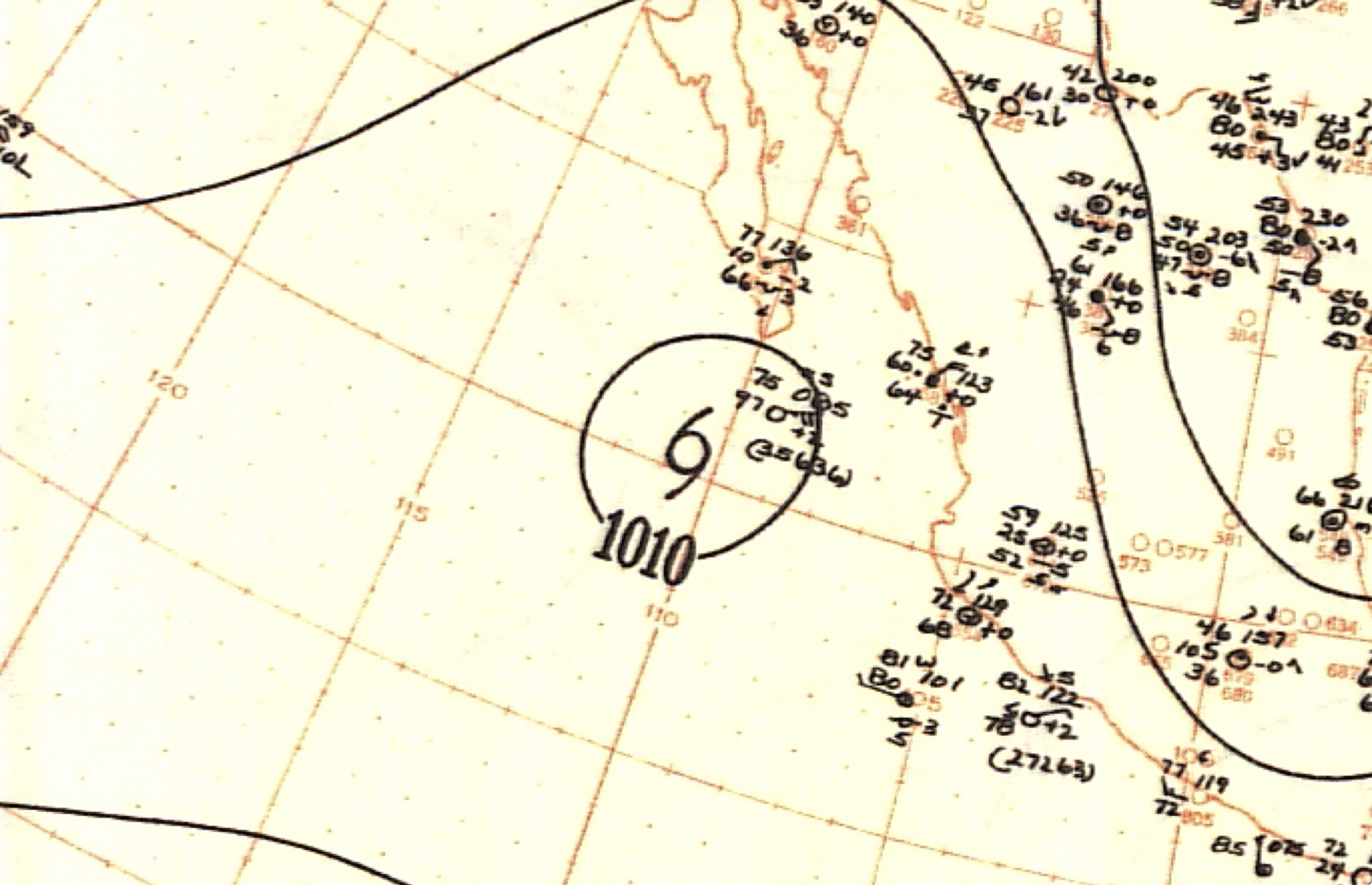
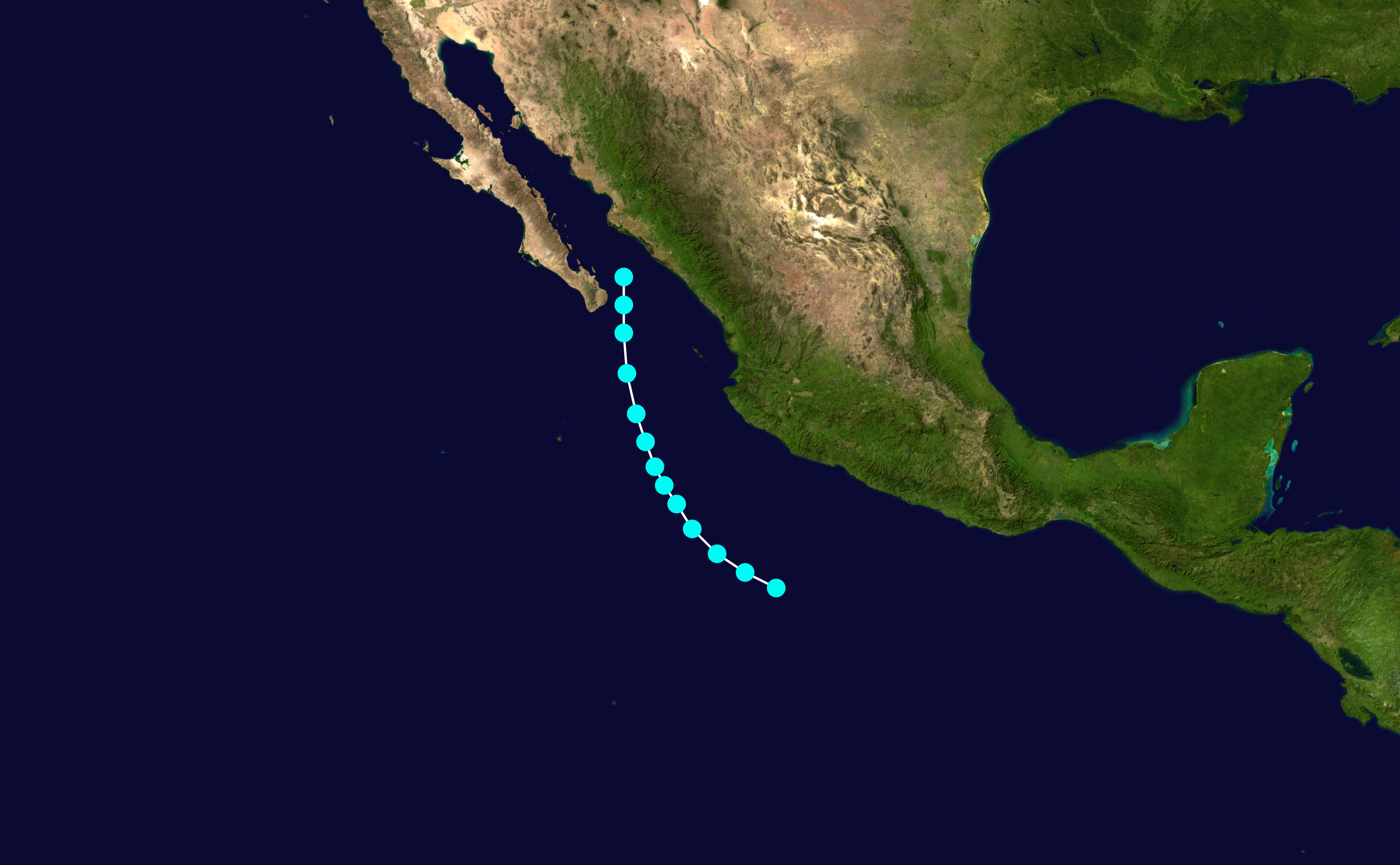
- Duration: November 27 – November 30
- Peak intensity: 50 mph (85 km/h) (1-min);

The final tropical cyclone of the season existed from November 27 to November 30.

=== Other system ===
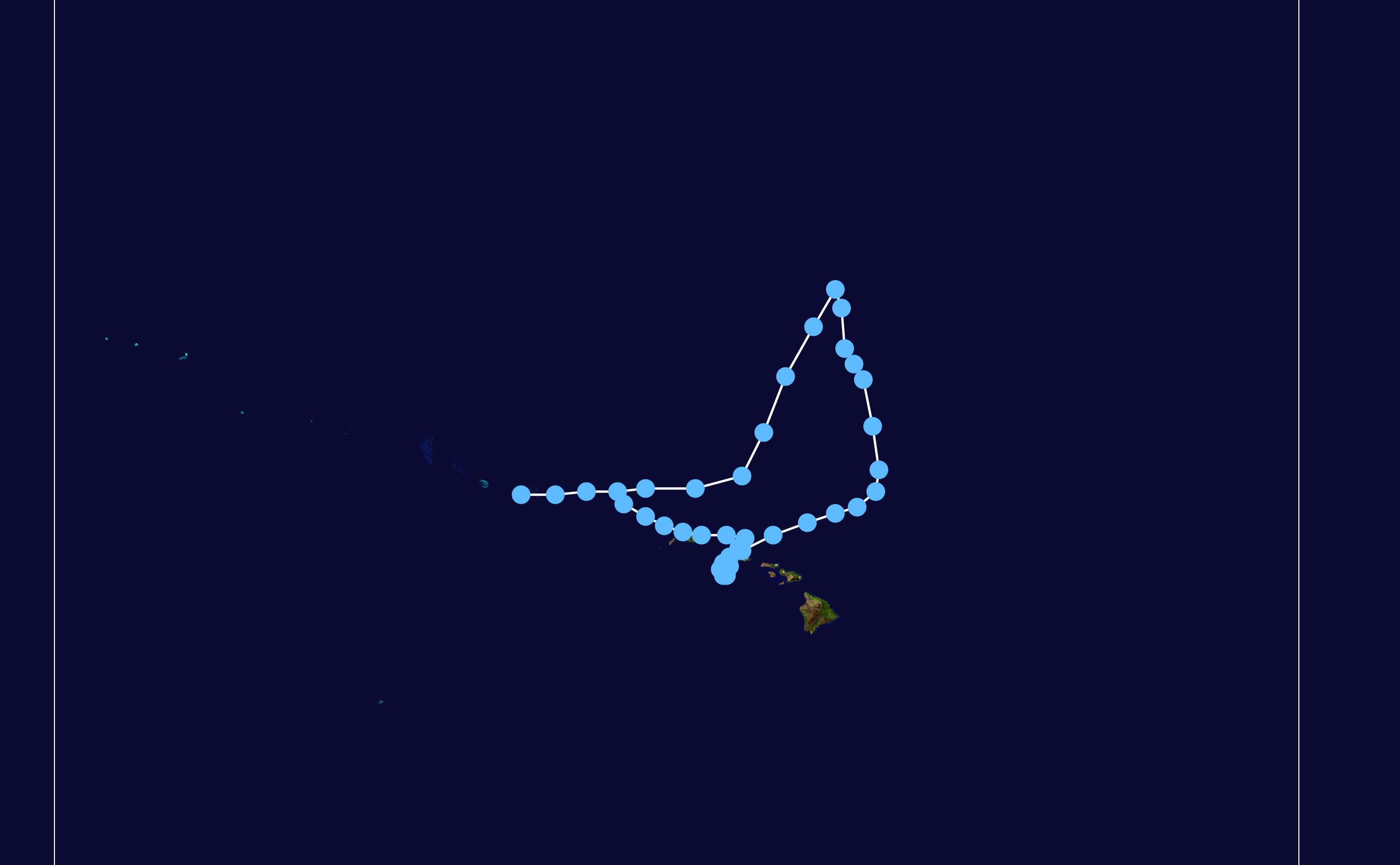
Map plotting the storm's track and intensity, according to the Saffir–Simpson scale Map key Saffir–Simpson scale Tropical depression (≤38 mph, ≤62 km/h) Tropical storm (39–73 mph, 63–118 km/h) Category 1 (74–95 mph, 119–153 km/h) Category 2 (96–110 mph, 154–177 km/h) Category 3 (111–129 mph, 178–208 km/h) Category 4 (130–156 mph, 209–251 km/h) Category 5 (≥157 mph, ≥252 km/h) Unknown Storm type Tropical cyclone Subtropical cyclone Extratropical cyclone, remnant low, tropical disturbance, or monsoon depression

A warm-core kona storm transitioned into a tropical cyclone at 0000 UTC on March 21, west of the Necker Island. At that time, the Joint Typhoon Warning Center (JTWC) began tracking the storm with winds of 30 mph (50 km/h), or tropical depression strength. The system began traveling eastward, and later to the northeast on March 22. Then, it turned sharply southward towards Hawaii on the same day. The system turned southwest toward the Hawaiian Islands at 0600 UTC of March 25, making its first landfall near Hauula on Oahu at 1200 UTC that day. The system weakened below tropical storm intensity as it passed through the island of Oahu. By six hours later, the system left the island and continued southward. Then, the system slowed down and curved back north toward Oahu. The system made a second landfall on Oahu near Mākaha, just past 0000 UTC on March 28. Later, the system scrapped the northwestern coast of the island. It re-entered the Pacific six hours later and turned west. The system then sped up and made its last landfall near Kealia, just past 0000 UTC on March 29. The storm moved quickly across the island, and it left the island about six hours later. The JTWC stopped tracking the system east of the island of Nīhoa eighteen hours later, after it had started to move across the Northwestern Hawaiian Islands.

The system has been considered a tropical or an extratropical cyclone. The JTWC and the American Meteorological Society (AMS) both consider the storm to be a tropical cyclone. However, the Regional Specialized Meteorological Centers for the eastern north Pacific, the National Hurricane Center (NHC) and Central Pacific Hurricane Center (CPHC) do not include the system in their archives. Due to this, the system was not considered tropical or subtropical officially. On March 25, tropical storm warnings were posted for the Hawaiian Islands. Winds of 60 mph (95 km/h) were reported in Oahu as the storm came near the island. In Honolulu, six inches (15 cm) of rain was reported. The system contributed to the already above-average rainfall in the Hawaiian Islands. The rainfall amount for March 1951 was nearly 200 to 700 percent above normal. The rainfall set records for that month, but they were later broken in 2006.

== See also ==
- List of Pacific hurricanes
- 1951 Atlantic hurricane season
- 1951 Pacific typhoon season
- Australian region cyclone seasons: 1950–51 1951–52
- South Pacific cyclone seasons: 1950–51 1951–52
- South-West Indian Ocean cyclone seasons: 1950–51 1951–52
