= Tropical Storm Charley (1998) =

Atlantic tropical storm in 1998

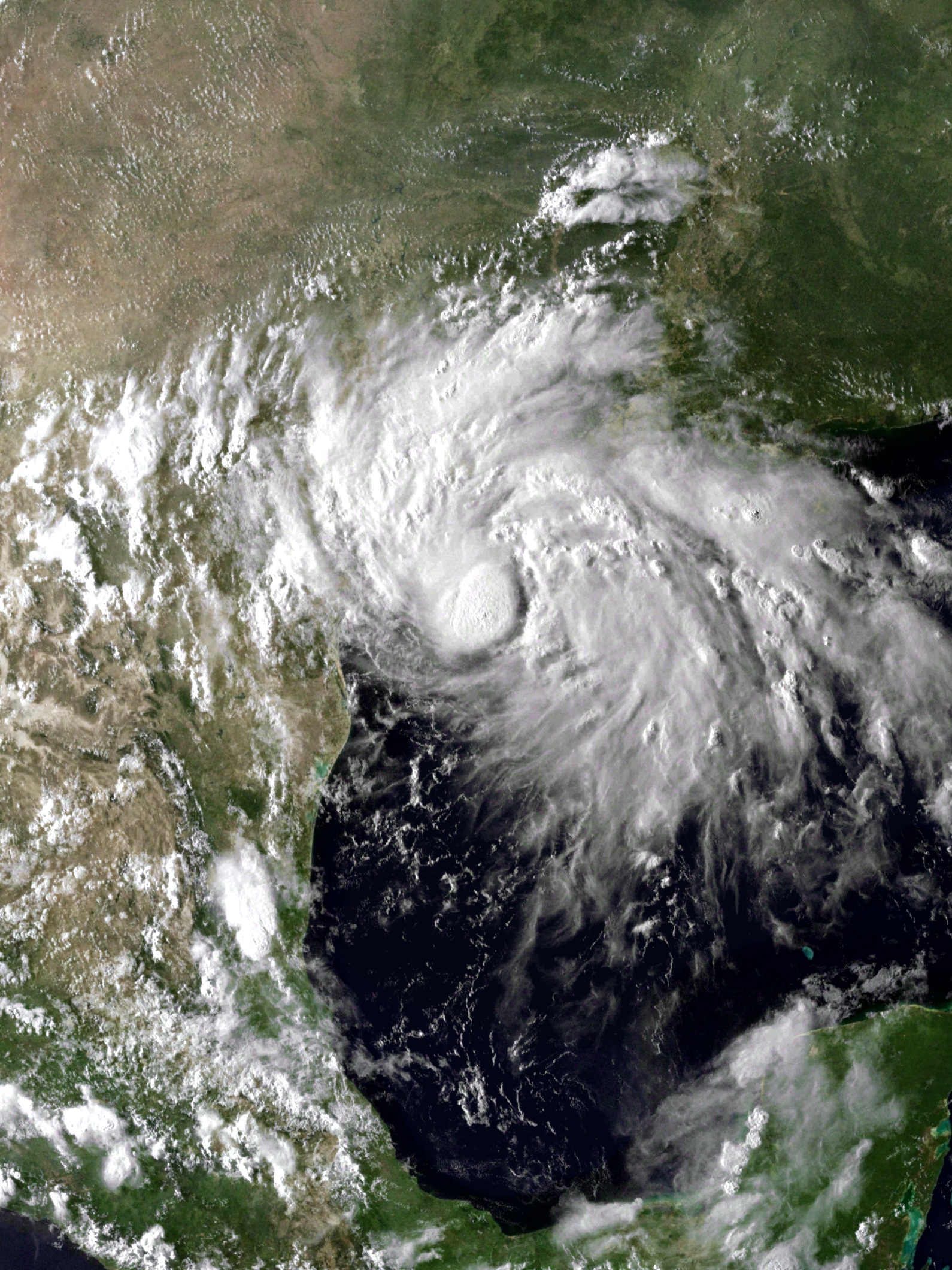
- Tropical Storm Charley near peak intensity off the coast of Texas on August 21

Meteorological history
- Formed: August 21, 1998
- Dissipated: August 24, 1998

Tropical storm
- 1-minute sustained (SSHWS/NWS)
- Highest winds: 70 mph (110 km/h)
- Lowest pressure: 1000 mbar (hPa); 29.53 inHg

Overall effects
- Fatalities: 20 direct, 6 missing
- Damage: $50 million (1998 USD)
- Areas affected: Texas, Mexico
- IBTrACS
- Part of the 1998 Atlantic hurricane season

Tropical Storm Charley was the third named storm of the 1998 Atlantic hurricane season. Charley was the first of two tropical storms to make landfall in Texas during that season (Frances being the other). The storm originated with a tropical wave that moved off the West African coast on August 9. The wave moved generally west-northwestward, producing occasional bursts of convection, finally arriving in the southeastern Gulf of Mexico by August 19, when animated satellite images began to indicate it had possibly developed a low pressure centre. Hurricane Hunter investigations into the system the next day revealed that this was not the case. The system lingered for two days, lacking an organized low level centre of circulation until early on the morning of August 21, when advisories were initiated on the tropical depression, 185 miles (298 km) east of Brownsville, Texas. The depression became a tropical storm later that day, as it moved steadily west-northwestward, strengthening, and then weakening again before making landfall the next morning around Port Aransas, Texas. The storm moved slowly inland and finally dissipated on the morning of the August 24 near the town of Del Rio, Texas.

Charley's impacts in Texas and Mexico were locally severe. In Texas, over 2000 homes were destroyed by the locally severe flooding, and 13 people died. In Mexico, over 12 inches (300 mm) of rain fell in northern areas near the Texas-Mexico border, and seven people were killed.

== Meteorological history ==
Map plotting the storm's track and intensity, according to the Saffir–Simpson scale Map key Saffir–Simpson scale Tropical depression (≤38 mph, ≤62 km/h) Tropical storm (39–73 mph, 63–118 km/h) Category 1 (74–95 mph, 119–153 km/h) Category 2 (96–110 mph, 154–177 km/h) Category 3 (111–129 mph, 178–208 km/h) Category 4 (130–156 mph, 209–251 km/h) Category 5 (≥157 mph, ≥252 km/h) Unknown Storm type Tropical cyclone Subtropical cyclone Extratropical cyclone, remnant low, tropical disturbance, or monsoon depression

Charley originated with a large swirl of clouds which parted off of the west coast of Africa on August 9. Lacking deep convection or a well defined centre, the wave continued west-northwestward without developing. Ten days later, on August 19, satellite images indicated the disturbance was beginning to rotate cyclonically over the southeastern Gulf of Mexico.

A reconnaissance aircraft flew into the system the next day. While strong winds were recorded, no circulation centre was present. The following morning, a second flight reported that a centre had formed, and the disturbance was designated a tropical depression. Initially, the centre was disorganized. However, convection over the depression blossomed, mostly concentrated over the northern semicircle. During the evening of August 21, the system was named Tropical Storm Charley.

As the system continued west-northwestward, more organized banding features developed, and the storm began to intensify. On August 22, it reached its peak intensity of 70 miles per hour (110 km/h). Subsequent reconnaissance reports indicated that winds had decreased, and the storm made landfall near Corpus Christi, Texas early on August 23, with maximum sustained winds of 45 miles per hour (72 km/h). Within hours, Charley was downgraded to tropical depression status as it continued to weaken. By August 24, Charley had dissipated over the Rio Grande near Del Rio, Texas. Although surface winds had diminished and a closed surface circulation no longer existed, a slow-moving remnant circulation aloft persisted in the Del Rio area and generated flooding rains that were most devastating in that area on August 23 and 24.

== Preparations ==
Tropical storm warnings were issued by the National Hurricane Center coincidentally with the first advisory on the depression, from High Island, Texas to Brownsville. Six hours later, these were extended eastward to Cameron, Louisiana. At landfall on August 22, the warnings north of Sabine Pass, Texas were expired, and the rest were dropped later that day.

In advance of the storm, thousands of oil workers were evacuated from Gulf of Mexico oil rigs. In Del Rio, some highways and roads were closed after the initial flooding, in anticipation of more flooding as the system stalled over the area. Of the 2000 Laredo, Texas residents ordered to leave their homes in anticipation of the Rio Grande overflowing its banks, only 600 actually did so.

== Impact ==
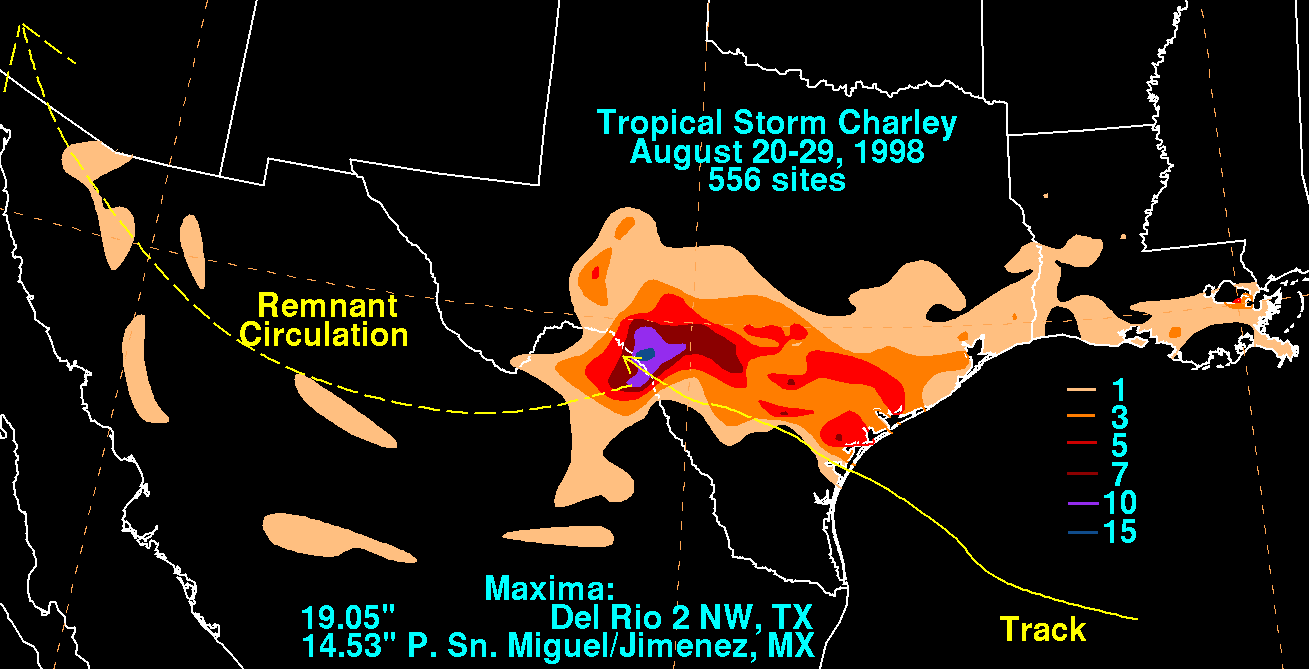
Rainfall totals from Charley

Being relatively weak, the storm's main impact was its heavy rainfall. Prolific, sometimes record amounts fell over much of south central Texas and northern Mexico. Few areas received sustained tropical storm force winds, and the storm surge was insignificant. There were no confirmed tornadoes. Twenty people died, all from drowning, and the storm caused $50 million (1998 USD; US$64 million in 2007) in damage.

=== Texas ===
The storm's major impact was its very heavy rain. A 90-mile (140 km) wide swath of over 3 inches (76 mm) of rainfall extended from the Middle Texas Coast west to the Texas-Mexico border. Charley produced 17 inches (430 mm) of rain in Del Rio in a 24-hour period, a new record daily rainfall for the city. Refugio, Texas received 7.2 inches (180 mm) of rain, and Woodsboro, Texas recorded 5 inches (130 mm). The storm surge on areas of the Texas coast was small. Port O'Connor recorded a storm surge of 2.3 feet (0.70 m), while Pleasure Pier was subjected to a 4.5 feet (1.4 m) surge. There were two reports of sustained tropical storm force winds, 41 miles per hour (66 km/h) and 39 miles per hour (63 km/h) from Rockport, Texas and Galveston, Texas respectively. The maximum wind gust was 63 miles per hour (101 km/h) at Port O'Connor, Texas. No tornadoes were confirmed by any NWS offices, although one suspected tornado did prompt a tornado warning.

Damage from the storm, while generally light, was severe locally. In Val Verde County, Texas, which took the vast majority of the damage, roughly 2000 houses, mobile homes, and apartments combined were destroyed by flooding. At one point, two-thirds of Del Rio was underwater after a natural dam broke in the San Felipe Creek, flooding the city with a sudden surge of water. The coastal storm surge destroyed several of the dunes on San Jose and Mustang Islands. There was also slight damage on Matagorda Island, where two shelters were destroyed by the surge flooding. Four people, including two toddlers, died when their truck was swept away by floodwaters and nine more drowned in flooding along the San Felipe Creek. Thirteen people died in Texas, all drownings. Charley left $50 million (1998 USD; US$64 million in 2007) in flood damage across southern Texas. Eight counties in Texas were declared disaster areas.

=== Mexico ===
While Mexico was not severely impacted by winds from the storm, heavy rain caused serious flooding in places. Augosto received maximum sustained winds of 52 miles per hour (84 km/h) and recorded a minimum pressure of 1,003 millibars (29.6 inHg). Jimenez received 14.53 inches (369 mm) of rainfall. In Ciudad Acuña, Coahuila, 6 feet (1.8 m) of flooding occurred as a result of the heavy rains. 450 houses were damaged in the city, and over 2000 people were injured. In Nuevo Laredo, Tamaulipas, heavy rains swelled the Rio Grande and caused significant flooding. 350 families were evacuated, and the city lost power and phone service.

Seven people died in Ciudad Acuña while they were trying to cross a flooded gully.

=== Louisiana ===
Several inches of rain fell in parts of Louisiana. Lake Charles, Louisiana received the most, with 1.2 inches (30 mm). Isolated wind gusts reached tropical storm force, and Lake Charles recorded a 43 miles per hour (69 km/h) gust. Charley did not cause any significant damage in Louisiana.

== See also ==
- Other storms of the same name
- Tropical Storm Erin (2007)
