= List of storms named Charley =

The name Charley or Charlie has been used for eight tropical cyclones and one subtropical cyclone in the Atlantic Ocean, and for one tropical cyclone in the Australian region of the South Pacific Ocean.

In the Atlantic:

- Hurricane Charlie (1950), Category 2 hurricane that did not affect land
- Hurricane Charlie (1951), Category 4 hurricane that struck Jamaica, the Yucatán Peninsula, and northeastern Mexico.
- Hurricane Charlie (1952), struck the Dominican Republic as a tropical storm before strengthening to a Category 3 hurricane and moving out to sea
- Subtropical Storm Charlie (1972), remained over the open ocean
- Hurricane Charley (1980), Category 1 hurricane that looped across the open ocean
- Hurricane Charley (1986), Category 1 hurricane that made landfall along the North Carolina coast, then moved out over the ocean, going on to hit Ireland and Great Britain as a strong extratropical storm
- Hurricane Charley (1992), Category 2 hurricane, affected the Azores
- Tropical Storm Charley (1998), made landfall near Port Aransas, Texas, causing significant flood damage to inland areas and killing 13 people
- Hurricane Charley (2004), Category 4 storm that struck Cuba and Florida, causing 10 deaths and $16.9 billion in damage, mostly in Southwest Florida

The name Charley was retired after the 2004 hurricane season. It was replaced by Colin in the 2010 season.

In the Australian region:

- Cyclone Charlie (1988), struck Ayr, Queensland, killing one person and leaving $2,300,000 (1988 USD) in damage

== See also ==
- Cyclone Charles (1978), a Category 3 severe tropical cyclone with a similar name that affected the Samoan Islands
