= Hurricane Charlie (1951) =

Category 4 Atlantic hurricane in 1951

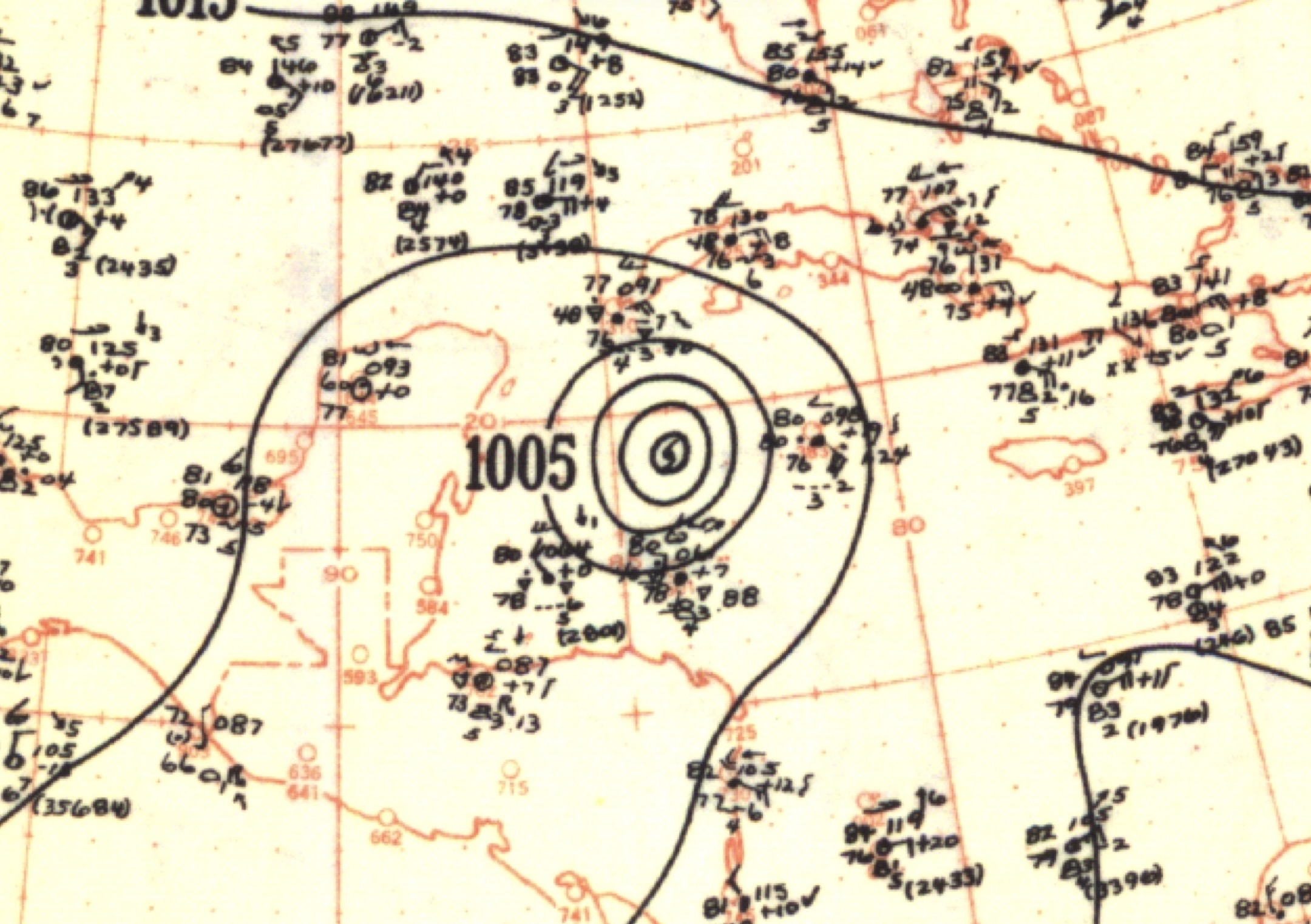
- Surface weather analysis of the hurricane near peak intensity and landfall in the Yucatán Peninsula on August 19

Meteorological history
- Formed: August 12, 1951
- Dissipated: August 23, 1951

Category 4 major hurricane
- 1-minute sustained (SSHWS/NWS)
- Highest winds: 130 mph (215 km/h)
- Highest gusts: 160 mph (260 km/h)
- Lowest pressure: ≤958 mbar (hPa); ≤28.29 inHg (estimated)

Overall effects
- Fatalities: 409
- Damage: $75 million (1951 USD)
- Areas affected: Lesser Antilles; Jamaica; Cayman Islands; Yucatán Peninsula; Tamaulipas; Texas
- IBTrACS
- Part of the 1951 Atlantic hurricane season

Hurricane Charlie was the deadliest Atlantic hurricane of the 1951 Atlantic hurricane season, the most powerful tropical cyclone to strike the island of Jamaica until Hurricane Gilbert in 1988, and at the time the worst natural disaster to affect that island. The third named storm, second hurricane, and first major hurricane of the season, it developed from a tropical wave east of the Lesser Antilles. It moved briskly west-northwest, passing between the islands of Dominica and Guadeloupe. It strengthened to a hurricane in the eastern Caribbean Sea, and it struck Jamaica as a high-end Category 3 hurricane. It strengthened to a peak intensity of 130 mph (215 km/h) prior to landfall on Quintana Roo, Yucatán Peninsula. It weakened over land, but re-strengthened over the Gulf of Mexico before making a final landfall near Tampico with winds of 115 mph (185 km/h).

In its path, Charlie, dubbed the Killer Hurricane by international media, caused more than 250 deaths, ranking among the deadliest Atlantic hurricanes of the 20th century. The hurricane produced Jamaica's deadliest natural disaster of the 20th century, causing more than 152 deaths and $50,000,000 in damages. The hurricane was described as Tampico's worst tropical cyclone since 1936, and it caused more than 100 fatalities in the surrounding areas. Many bodies were not recovered after flooding. The hurricane produced peak gusts of 160 mph (260 km/h) at the airport, and its strongest sustained winds were unmeasured in mainland Mexico, giving rise to suggestions at the time that it may have been a Category 4 hurricane at landfall, though available data indicate that it was more likely a marginal Category 3 hurricane upon striking land in Tamaulipas.

== Meteorological history ==
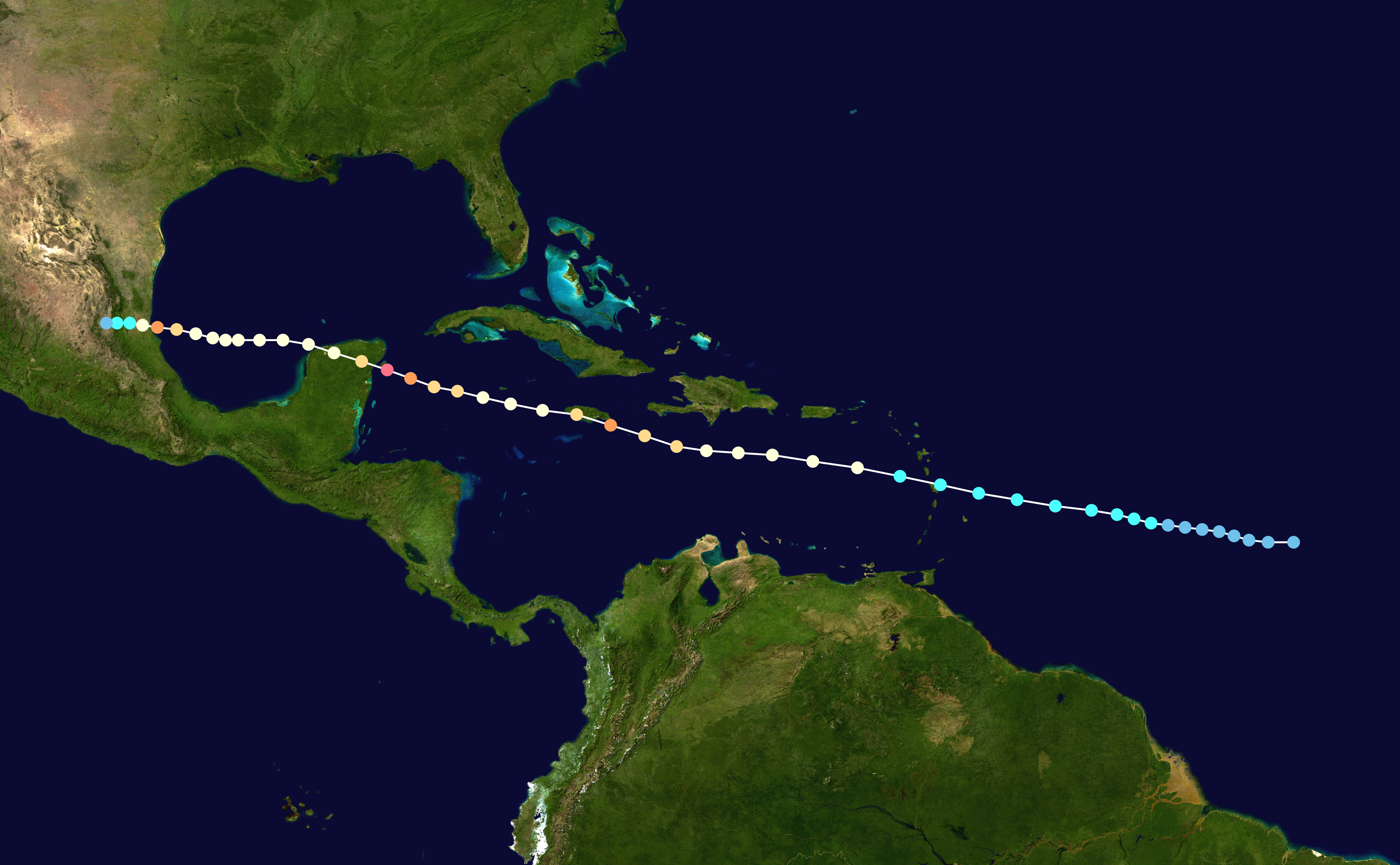
Map plotting the storm's track and intensity, according to the Saffir–Simpson scale Map key Saffir–Simpson scale Tropical depression (≤38 mph, ≤62 km/h) Tropical storm (39–73 mph, 63–118 km/h) Category 1 (74–95 mph, 119–153 km/h) Category 2 (96–110 mph, 154–177 km/h) Category 3 (111–129 mph, 178–208 km/h) Category 4 (130–156 mph, 209–251 km/h) Category 5 (≥157 mph, ≥252 km/h) Unknown Storm type Tropical cyclone Subtropical cyclone Extratropical cyclone, remnant low, tropical disturbance, or monsoon depression

At 00:00 UTC on August 12, a tropical wave organized into a tropical depression about 1,000 miles (1,610 km) east-southeast of the island of Barbados, near 12.1°N 44.1°W. Heading generally north of due west, the depression gradually intensified, becoming a weak tropical storm two days later. Shortly afterward the cyclone was first detected by United States Navy (USN) hurricane hunters and noted operationally by the United States Weather Bureau weather forecast office in San Juan, Puerto Rico. On August 15 the system underwent more robust intensification, and a subsequent mission by the hurricane hunters found flight-level winds of 90 kn (100 mph; 170 km/h). (Note: Note, however, that reconnaissance-derived estimates of wind speed are considered unreliable prior to the mid-1970s, if not more than a decade later.) Reanalysis by the National Oceanic and Atmospheric Administration (NOAA) in 2012 determined that the cyclone, which was of limited extent at the time, passed between Guadeloupe and Dominica with winds of 65–70 mph (100–110 km/h); contemporary observers then considered the storm an open wave, a "slight disturbance", as neither island reported winds higher than 35 mph (56 km/h), though the center of circulation was deemed to be quite small.

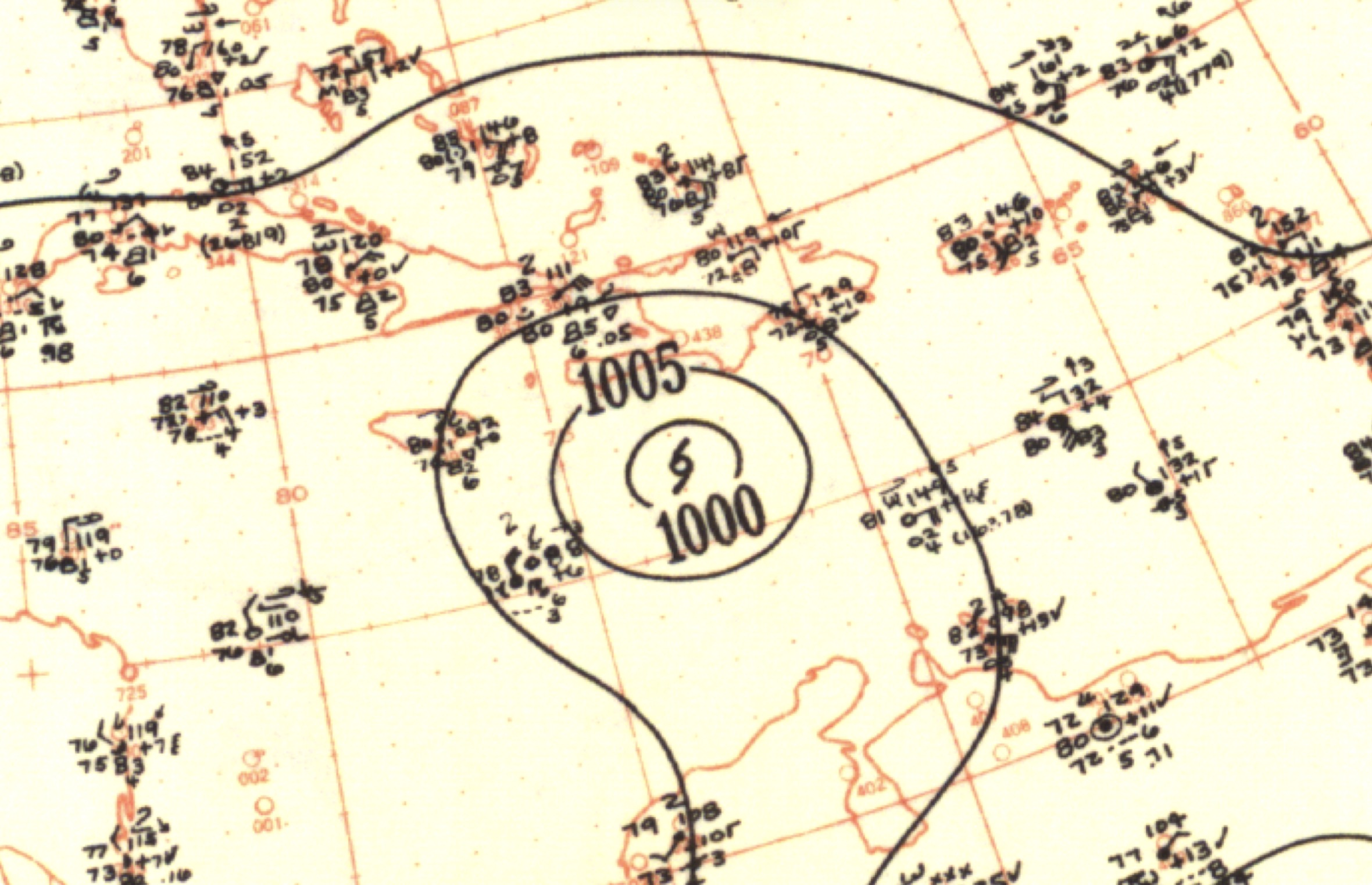
Surface weather map on August 17, showing Hurricane Charlie approaching Jamaica

On August 16, Tropical Storm Charlie, continuing to deepen, attained maximum sustained winds of 75 mph (120 km/h) by 06:00 UTC, becoming equivalent to a Category 1 hurricane on the current Saffir–Simpson scale. Maintaining its north-of-due-west heading, the hurricane moved rapidly west-northwestward over the eastern Caribbean, while located about 180 miles (290 km) south-southwest of San Juan. Just before 19:00 UTC on August 17, United States Air Force (USAF) Hurricane Hunters intercepted the tiny, 5-nautical-mile-wide (5.8 mi; 9.3 km) eye of Charlie and measured an atmospheric pressure of 971 mb (28.7 inHg), which suggested maximum sustained winds of 110 mph (175 km/h) at the time, making Charlie equivalent to a high-end Category 2 hurricane. The cyclone rapidly intensified into a major hurricane, which is Category 3 or higher on the Saffir–Simpson scale, as it neared Jamaica, and made landfall at 03:00 UTC on August 18, a short distance south of Kingston, with winds of 125 mph (205 km/h), becoming the strongest hurricane to make landfall on the island prior to Hurricane Gilbert in 1988. The city of Kingston reported peak winds of 110 mph (180 km/h) as the center passed 8 mi (13 km) to the south, and the minimum central pressure in the eye was tentatively estimated to have been near 958 mb (28.3 inHg). The small hurricane weakened rapidly once inland, and some time after 06:00 UTC left Jamaica with winds of 85 mph (140 km/h), but quickly re-intensified over water. It passed south of the Cayman Islands, generating gusts of 92 mph (148 km/h) on Grand Cayman. By 18:00 UTC on August 19, the cyclone regained major-hurricane intensity, and six hours later peaked with winds of 130 mph (215 km/h), equivalent to a low-end Category 4 hurricane. At 03:00 UTC on August 20, Charlie made landfall on the Yucatán Peninsula near Akumal, Quintana Roo, at its peak intensity. Cozumel, north of the eye, registered hurricane-force winds and a barometric pressure of 965 mb (28.5 inHg). Charlie subsequently weakened as it crossed the Yucatán Peninsula.

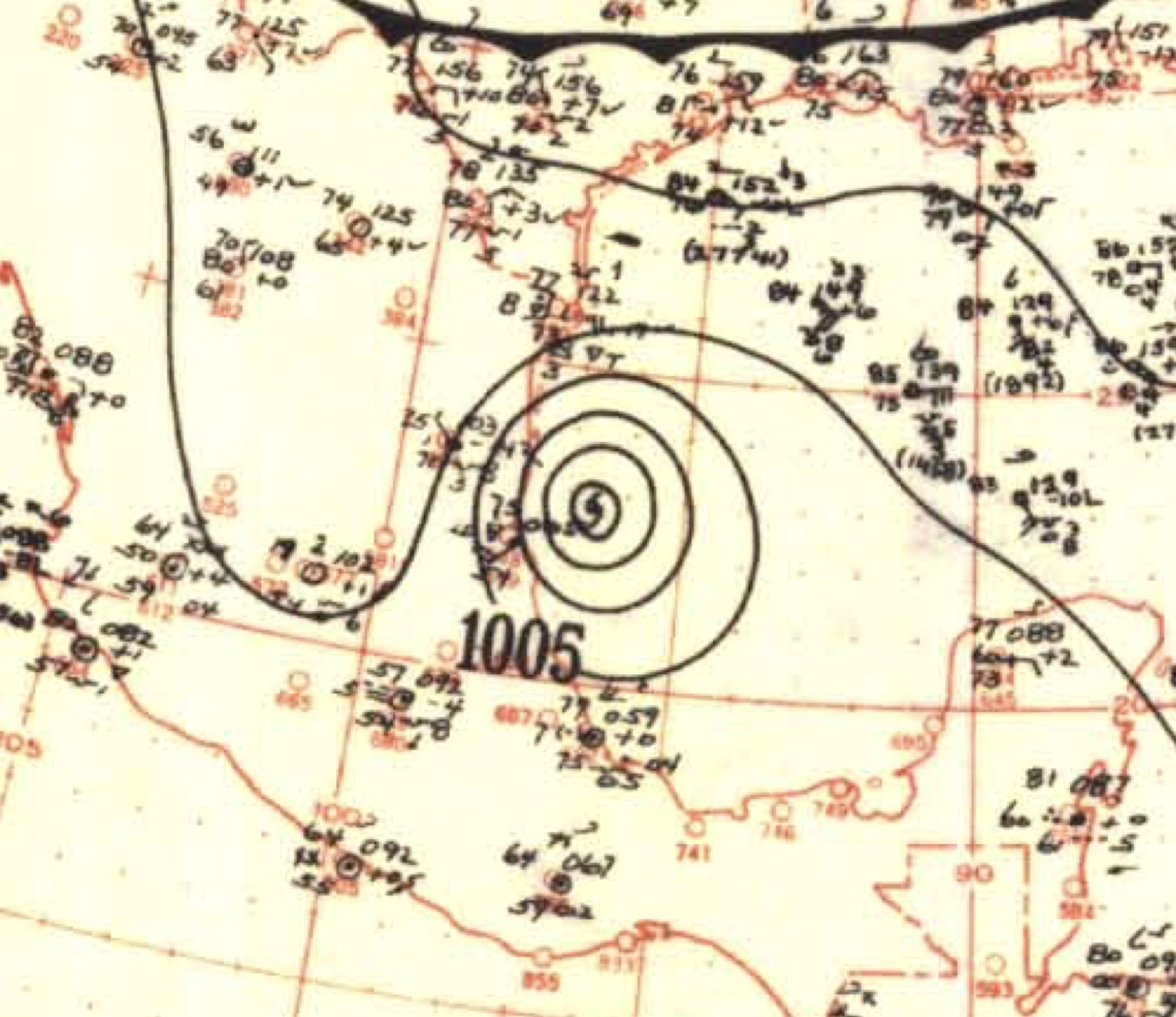
Weather map of Hurricane Charlie approaching landfall in Mexico on August 22

Upon reaching the Gulf of Mexico, Charlie had weakened to a minimal hurricane. On August 21, it maintained intensity while crossing the Gulf of Mexico until 18 hours before landfall. Beginning early on August 22, Charlie once again underwent rapid intensification, strengthening to its second peak of 115 mph (185 km/h) just off the mainland Mexican coast; operationally, the Hurricane Hunters indicated peak winds of 130 mph (215 km/h) at the time, which would have made Charlie a Category 4 hurricane, but these were subsequently deemed an overestimate by reanalysis. At 19:00 UTC, Charlie made landfall near Ciudad Madero, just north of Tampico, at the same intensity, equivalent to a low-end Category 3 hurricane. The city of Tampico entered the southern portion of the storm's eye, registering a minimum barometric pressure of 28.81 inHg (976 mb) and peak winds of 110 mph (180 km/h). The strongest winds were believed to have been north of the eye, and were unrecorded, while the storm's lowest pressure was estimated to have been near 968 mb (28.6 inHg) at landfall, for the winds at Tampico only lulled during the passage of the eye and did not indicate a complete calm. After landfall, the storm quickly weakened over land, and it dissipated late on August 23 in the Mexican state of Tamaulipas.

== Preparations ==
On August 15, the Weather Bureau office in San Juan issued hurricane warnings for the eastern Caribbean from Martinique to Antigua, while storm warnings were released for the rest of the Leeward Islands. Later, hurricane warnings were also issued for the northern Leeward Islands, and northeast storm warnings were released for Puerto Rico and the Virgin Islands. In advance of the hurricane, flights' scheduled departures for the Barbados region were delayed. On August 17, the Weather Bureau noted that the hurricane would affect Jamaica, though it was not expected to strengthen significantly; the agency also reported that the probabilities were equal for the cyclone to pass north or south of the island. Later, the cyclone was forecast to pass "over or just south" of the island; Jamaica was urged to prepare for the cyclone, and the hurricane was expected to strengthen as the forward motion decreased. On August 20, the cyclone was expected to affect the northern Yucatán Peninsula between Mérida and Campeche, and "extreme caution" was advised for the area.

The hurricane was also expected to re-strengthen prior to its second landfall in Mexico, though the Weather Bureau also noted that there was a chance for the storm to affect Texas. Although the possibility never materialized, the agency expected rain bands and rough seas to affect southern Texas, and small watercraft were urged to remain in ports until the hurricane moved inland. On August 21, the cyclone was expected to move ashore between Nautla and Tuxpan, though it eventually made landfall further north near Tampico. Local officials expressed concerns about residents in huts and other vulnerable structures. In the Harlingen Valley region of southern Texas, precautionary measures were taken and Red Cross divisions organized a meeting at the local city hall. City departments and facilities were ready for disposal if the cyclone moved closer to the area. The cyclone's rains were also expected to impact unpicked cotton plants in the region. In advance of the storm, a Coast Guard plane dropped messages from the air to several vessels, advising them to seek shelter. In Tampico, oil industries erected barriers to protect fields, and authorities planned to evacuate residents from the surrounding low-lying areas. Thousands of residents stayed in refugee centers on elevated ground.

== Impact ==
The cyclone was compact when it moved through the Lesser Antilles, and the strongest winds on land in the eastern Caribbean islands did not reach gale force.

In Jamaica, the hurricane produced heavy rainfall that peaked at 17 inches (430 mm) in Kingston, which caused numerous landslides across eastern sections of the island. Peak gusts were estimated near 125 mph (201 km/h) across the island. Kingston reported its greatest natural disaster since the 1907 earthquake, with 54 dead citywide. A hangar and installations were destroyed at Palisadoes Airport, and the facility received "extensive damage." Consequently, Chicago and Southern Airlines headquarters in Memphis, Tennessee, notified the press that its Constellation flights from Chicago to Caracas via Kingston were forced to divert their operations from Kingston. Several ships were sunk or overturned during the storm. Communications and power services were disrupted, suspending information from the island's interior. Four-fifths of Morant Bay were destroyed, and Port Royal was reportedly flattened. May Pen and Spanish Town incurred significant damage as well. The hurricane also cut communications from the island to radio stations in the United States. 70–80% of the island's banana crops were destroyed, in addition to 30% of other crops. 70 convicted felons also escaped from a jail when winds blew down walls. Flooding was expected in the island's mountainous interior because of heavy precipitation. Heavy rains caused rock slides, damaging roads, railroads, and other sources of tourism. In Kingston, electricity was initially restored to essential services, including newspaper and refrigerating plants, hospitals, and pumping stations. On Jamaica Charlie caused around $50 million (1951 USD, $380 million 2005 USD) in crop and property damage, killed 152 people, injured 2,000, and left 25,000 homeless.

On the Yucatán Peninsula, Charlie destroyed up to 70% of the crops, though no loss of life was reported in the area. Unofficially, one person was reportedly killed on the peninsula. Mérida reported winds of 70 mph (110 km/h). The winds toppled several thatched homes on Cozumel. A wind gust of 160 mph (260 km/h) was measured at the airport near Tampico, though peak gusts in the city did not exceed 110 mph (180 km/h). The storm was reported to be the worst in Tampico since 1936. The winds uprooted trees and destroyed telephone poles, and damages to corn crops were believed to exceed $500,000. At least 300 residences were "damaged or destroyed." Outside the city, Charlie's heavy rain led to bursting dams and flooded rivers, where upward of 100 people died. In the city, four people died, and property losses were estimated near $1,160,000. Across Mexico, the hurricane killed 257 people.

The hurricane's outer fringes produced swells along the Texas coast, and swimmers were advised to be cautious because of hazardous conditions. The area was also experiencing rough swells and strong winds from an unrelated weather system, which produced peak gusts of 60 mph (97 km/h). The conditions snarled marine operations in the area, and three fishermen were missing during the squall. On August 23, Brownsville experienced gusts of 50 mph (80 km/h) when the hurricane struck the coast further south.

== Aftermath ==
In the wake of this storm, Jamaica formed a new governmental entity known as the Hurricane Housing Organization. In 1956, this organization merged with the Central Housing Authority to become the Department of Housing. With an estimated 259 or more fatalities in Mexico and Jamaica, Charlie ranks among the deadliest Atlantic hurricanes on record in the 20th century. Lord Beginner wrote a calypso song about the hurricane's landfall in Jamaica entitled "Jamaica Hurricane". The next hurricane to make landfall on Jamaica, Hurricane Gilbert, occurred 37 years later.

== See also ==
- List of Jamaica hurricanes
- List of Mexico hurricanes
- Other similarly named storms

== Sources ==
- International Best Track Archive for Climate Stewardship (IBTrACS) (September 2022). IBTrACS browser (hosted by UNC Asheville) (Report). National Centers for Environmental Information – via World Data Center for Meteorology.
- Landsea, Christopher W.; Strahan-Sakoskie, Donna; Hagen, Andrew (July 2012). "A Reanalysis of the 1944–53 Atlantic Hurricane Seasons—The First Decade of Aircraft Reconnaissance" (PDF). Journal of Climate. 25 (13). Boston: American Meteorological Society: 4441–4460. Bibcode:2012JCli...25.4441H. doi:10.1175/JCLI-D-11-00419.1 – via Atlantic Oceanographic and Meteorological Laboratory.
- Norton, Grady (January 1952). Caskey, Jr., James E. (ed.). "Hurricanes of 1951" (PDF). Monthly Weather Review. 80 (1). Washington, D.C.: 1–4. Bibcode:1952MWRv...80....1N. doi:10.1175/1520-0493(1952)080<0001:HO>2.0.CO;2. Archived from the original (PDF) on 3 March 2017 – via American Meteorological Society.
- Tannehill, I. R. (1952) [1938]. Hurricanes: Their Nature and History (8th ed.). Princeton, New Jersey: Princeton University Press. OCLC 3024697 – via Internet Archive.
- "The Hurricane and Its Effects" ( (PDF)). Hurricane Gilbert – Jamaica (PDF) (Technical report). Disaster Reports. Pan American Health Organization Emergency Preparedness and Disaster Relief Coordination Program. February 20, 1999. pp. 5–8. 5, Hurricane Gilbert in Jamaica. Archived from the original on 22 February 2012 – via Centro Regional de Información sobre Desastres América Latina y El Caribe.
