= Typhoon Marge (1951) =

Pacific typhoon in 1951

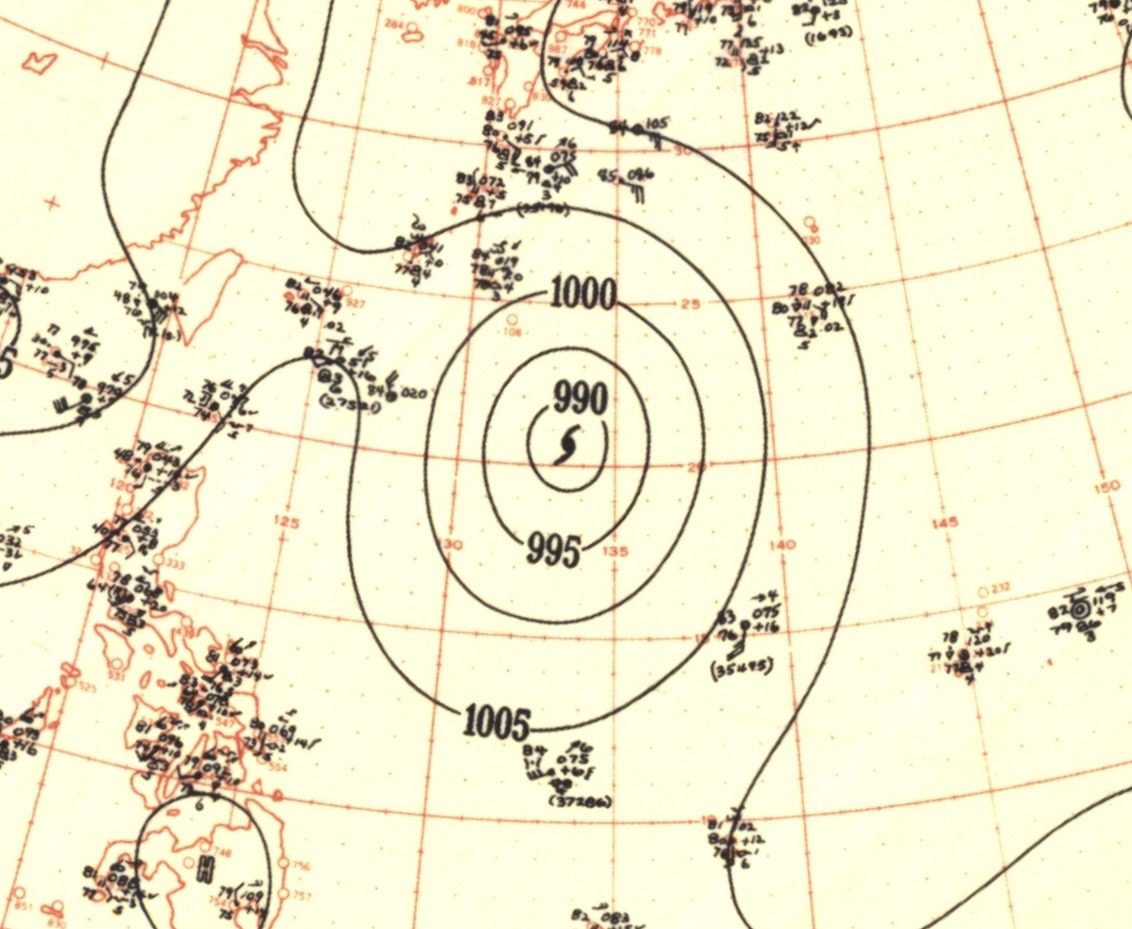
- Surface weather analysis on August 15, showing Typhoon Marge at peak intensity

Meteorological history
- Formed: August 10, 1951
- Dissipated: August 24, 1951

Typhoon
- 10-minute sustained (JMA)
- Lowest pressure: 886 hPa (mbar); 26.16 inHg

Category 3-equivalent typhoon
- 1-minute sustained (SSHWS/JTWC)
- Highest winds: 185 km/h (115 mph)

Overall effects
- Fatalities: 12
- Areas affected: Korea, Japan, China
- Part of the 1951 Pacific typhoon season

Typhoon Marge was an unusually intense and large typhoon that formed in August 1951 during the 1951 Pacific typhoon season. Although it was a category three typhoon, Marge took the record of being the largest cyclone for 28 years, until it got preceded by Typhoon Tip in 1979, having doubled the size. The seventh storm of the 1951 Pacific typhoon season, Marge originated from a disturbance, just southeast of Guam on August 10. Just as it was about to intensify, it slowly was tracking a western path, before its rapid intesification, which it started to track northwest. It reached its peak intensity of 185 km/h, as a category 3 typhoon.

== Meteorological history ==
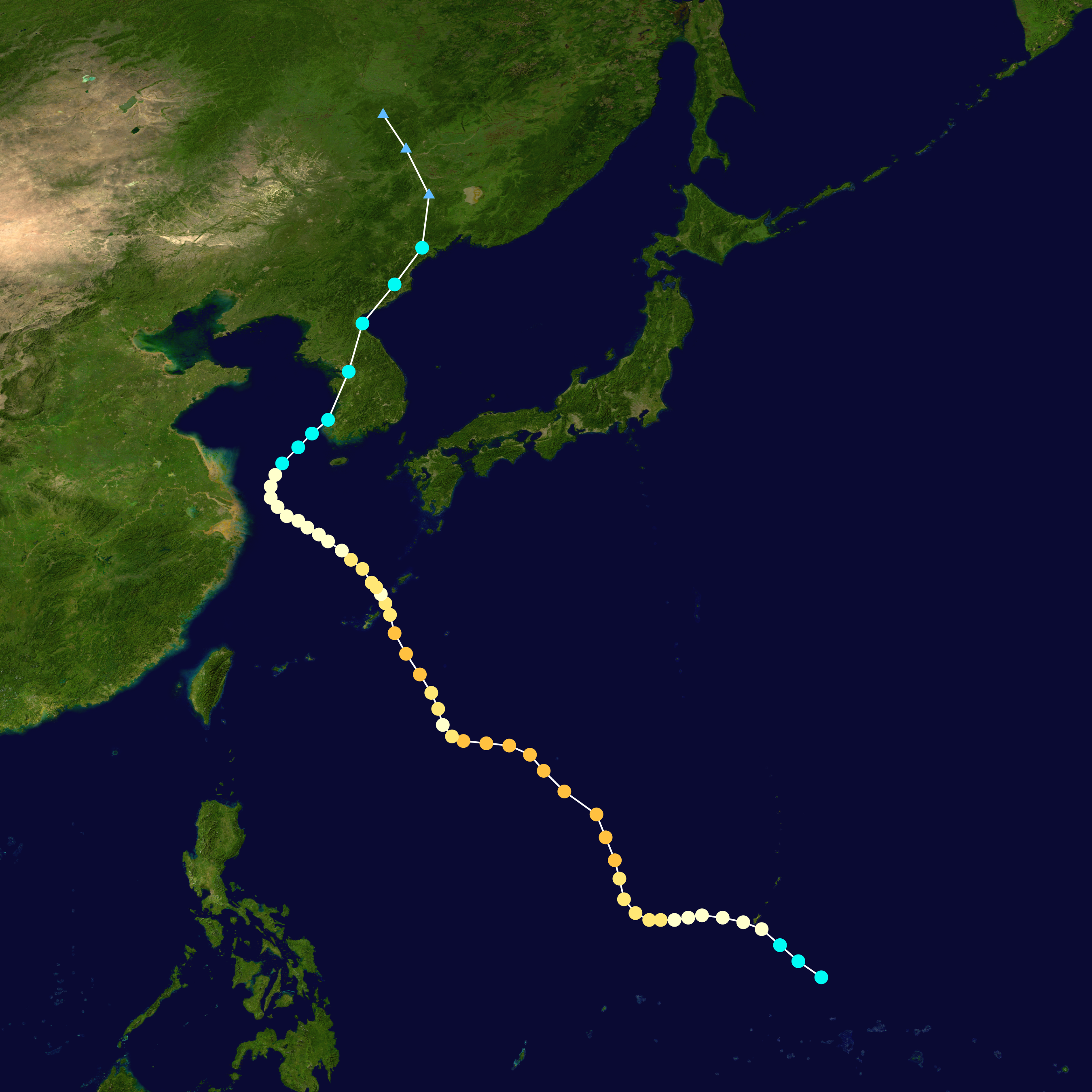
Map plotting the storm's track and intensity, according to the Saffir–Simpson scale Map key Saffir–Simpson scale Tropical depression (≤38 mph, ≤62 km/h) Tropical storm (39–73 mph, 63–118 km/h) Category 1 (74–95 mph, 119–153 km/h) Category 2 (96–110 mph, 154–177 km/h) Category 3 (111–129 mph, 178–208 km/h) Category 4 (130–156 mph, 209–251 km/h) Category 5 (≥157 mph, ≥252 km/h) Unknown Storm type Tropical cyclone Subtropical cyclone Extratropical cyclone, remnant low, tropical disturbance, or monsoon depression

Typhoon Marge originated as a tropical storm southeast of Guam on August 10. Tracking towards the northwest, the strengthening system passed just south of the island the following day as a typhoon. On August 13, the storm began taking a more northwesterly path as it continued to intensify, reaching its peak intensity two days with maximum winds estimated to be at least 185 km/h (115 mph) and a remarkably low pressure of 886 mbar (hPa; 26.16 inHg). Fluctuating in strength over the following days, Marge passed over the Amami Islands on August 18 before a more steadily weakening trend took hold as the typhoon moved into the East China Sea. The storm passed just offshore Shanghai before curving sharply towards the northeast into the Yellow Sea on August 21. Marge weakened to a tropical storm the next day after spending 11 continuous days as a typhoon. The cyclone made landfall near Boryeong, South Korea on August 23 and accelerated northeastwards across the Korean Peninsula, transitioning into an extratropical cyclone over far-northeastern Manchuria before dissipating after August 24.

== Records ==
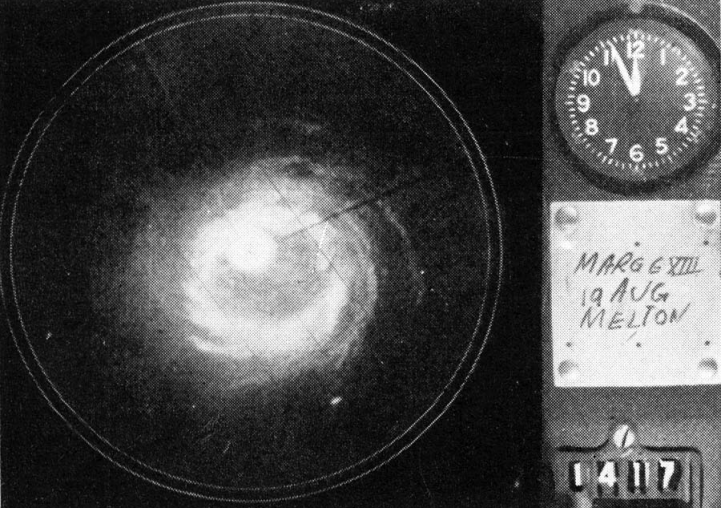
Radar image of the eye of Typhoon Marge, taken on August 19

Marge was the largest tropical cyclone ever observed to date, with a wind circulation extending 1,160 km (720 mi) in diameter; this record stood until it was preceded by Typhoon Tip in 1979. Meteorologist Robert Simpson flew on board a reconnaissance mission that flew into Marge near its peak strength and documented the eye's visual and sampled characteristics. Simpson did state that Marge could be anywhere above 115mph(185km/h). The flight was an atypical departure from normal reconnaissance missions due to secondary—albeit procedurally constrained—storm-research objectives. Publishing his findings in the Bulletin of the American Meteorological Society in 1952, his work would be instrumental in the understanding of tropical cyclone structure.

== Impact ==
United Nations naval vessels and United States Navy armaments responding to the Korean War were evacuated from the western coast of the Korean peninsula in advance of the approaching typhoon. Gusts as high as 180 km/h (112 mph) were reported in Okinawa in what was considered the island's most impactful typhoon since U.S. military occupation in 1945. Although damage was minimal to U.S. military installations, crop damage was extensive in other parts of Okinawa and several roads and highways were washed out by the heavy rains and surf. Impacts were more extensive further north of Kyushu, where rainfall totals as high as 400 mm (16 in) produced widespread flooding that flooded rice paddies and over a thousand homes, prompting the evacuation of 11,943 people. Offshore, twelve fishing boats capsized in the rough surf, and storm surge killed four in the Kyushu village of Yoshikawa. Across southern Japan, there were 12 deaths and 53 injuries caused by Marge. In South Korea, the Busan area was particularly hard hit, with coastal flooding displacing 550 people from their destroyed wooden homes. A half-mile segment of railroad between Yeosu and Daejeon was also washed out.
