= 1957 Atlantic hurricane season =

- Season summary map

Seasonal boundaries
- First system formed: June 8, 1957
- Last system dissipated: October 27, 1957

Strongest storm
- Name: Carrie
  - Maximum winds: 140 mph (220 km/h) (1-minute sustained)
  - Lowest pressure: 945 mbar (hPa; 27.91 inHg)

Seasonal statistics
- Total depressions: 8
- Total storms: 8
- Hurricanes: 3
- Major hurricanes (Cat. 3+): 2
- Total fatalities: 506 direct, 7 indirect
- Total damage: $152.5 million (1957 USD)

Related articles
- 1957 Pacific hurricane season; 1957 Pacific typhoon season; 1950s North Indian Ocean cyclone seasons

The 1957 Atlantic hurricane season featured one of the longest-travelling tropical cyclones in the Atlantic basin, Hurricane Carrie. Nevertheless, the season was generally inactive, with eight tropical storms – two of which went unnamed – and three hurricanes, two of which intensified further to attain major hurricane intensity. (Note: A major hurricane is a storm that ranks as Category 3 or higher on the Saffir–Simpson hurricane scale.) The season officially began on June 15 and ended on November 15, though the year's first tropical cyclone developed prior to the start of the season on June 8. The final storm dissipated on October 27, well before the official end of the season. The strongest hurricane of the year was Carrie, which reached the equivalent of a Category 4 hurricane on the Saffir–Simpson hurricane scale on two separate occasions in the open Atlantic; Carrie later caused the sinking of the German ship Pamir southwest of the Azores, resulting in 80 deaths.

In total, the season resulted in at least 513 fatalities and $152.5 million in damages. (Note: All damage totals are in 1957 United States dollars unless otherwise noted.) Hurricane Audrey was the season's most destructive and deadly storm, causing 416 deaths and about $150 million in damages. Audrey made landfall just east of Sabine Pass, Texas, in the U.S. state of Louisiana as a strong Category 3 hurricane in late June. Three other tropical storms in the year made landfalls along the Gulf Coast of the United States, bringing heavy rains that resulted in widespread flooding across much of the Southeastern United States. The highest rainfall total measured associated with a tropical cyclone was 18.39 in (467 mm) in Quarantine, Louisiana, during Tropical Storm Esther. However, an unofficial reading of 19 in (480 mm) was measured in an unknown location in the Florida Panhandle during Tropical Storm One. The year's other tropical systems curved out to sea without causing much impact. After the season, the name Audrey was retired.

== Season summary ==
The Atlantic hurricane season officially began on June 15, 1957. It was a below-average season in which eight tropical cyclones formed, of which three became hurricanes. Of these hurricanes, two became major hurricanes. In an average season, ten tropical cyclones form, of which five become hurricanes. Five of the season's eight tropical cyclones developed in the Gulf of Mexico, the most since the 1936 season, in which six formed in the gulf. The first tropical storm of the season formed on June 8, a week before the official start of the hurricane season. However, the first named storm, Audrey, formed afterwards, on June 25; these two storms were the only to form in June during the season. July featured no Atlantic tropical cyclones. Tropical Storm Bertha was the only system to form during August, developing in the Gulf of Mexico. Despite warm sea surface temperatures (SSTs) in the tropical Atlantic, no storms formed during the month, below the climatological average of one. The low monthly activity was in part due to an unfavorable wind pattern which prevailed across the Atlantic for much of the month. In September, however, conditions for tropical cyclogenesis were more favorable, with concomitant cyclonic activity. Four storms formed, of which two attained hurricane strength, higher than the mean activity of the last 70 Septembers. By contrast, only one tropical storm formed in October, below the average of two in the month. This tropical storm dissipated on October 27, 16 days before the official end of the hurricane season on November 15.

Five tropical cyclones made landfall during the hurricane season, including one hurricane. All of these storms made landfall on the Gulf Coast of the United States. Property damage that resulted from cyclone-related impacts totaled to $152 million in the United States, with most caused by Hurricane Audrey, which made landfall near the border between Texas and Louisiana. 513 deaths were also caused by tropical storms during the season, with 416 deaths attributable to Hurricane Audrey.

The season's activity was reflective with an accumulated cyclone energy (ACE) rating of 84, which is categorized as being "near normal." However, this was under the 1950–2000 average of 96.1. ACE is, broadly speaking, a measure of the power of hurricanes multiplied by the length of time it existed, so storms that last a long time, as well as particularly strong hurricanes, have high ACEs. It is only calculated for full advisories on tropical cyclones with winds exceeding 39 mph (63 km/h), which is tropical storm strength.

== Systems ==
=== Unnamed June tropical storm ===
- Tropical storm (SSHWS)
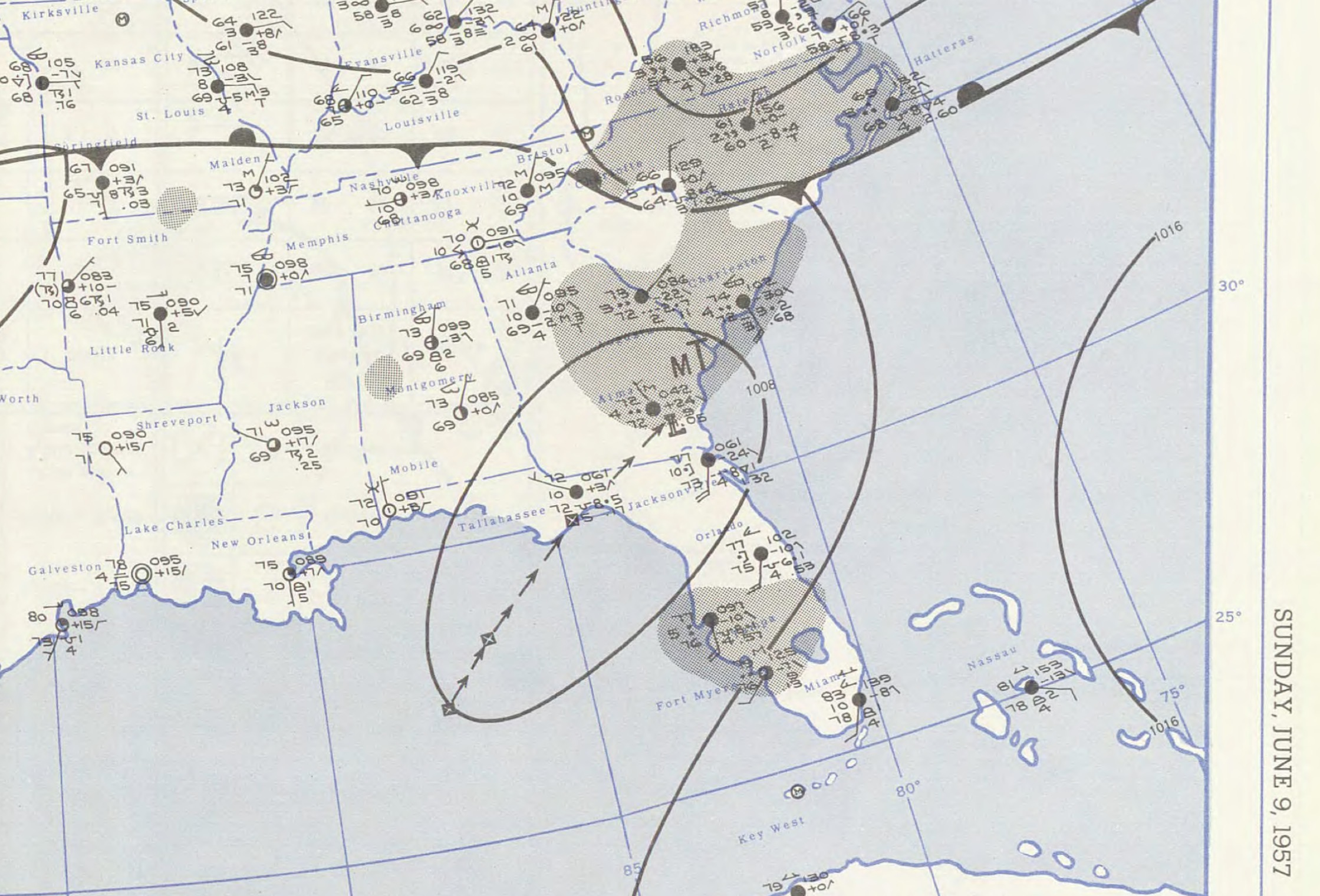
- Duration: June 8 – June 15 (extratropical after June 10)
- Peak intensity: 65 mph (100 km/h) (1-min); 1000 mbar (hPa)

An area of disturbed weather accompanied by low barometric pressure was first identified near the Yucatán Peninsula on June 7. Reports from the following day in the region reported pressures that were indicative of a developing tropical cyclone, and at 06:00 UTC, the disturbance attained tropical storm strength, the first of the season. Though hurricane reconnaissance flights could not locate a well-defined center, ship observations showed that the tropical storm was moving quickly to the northeast. Due to its fast forward motion, the storm gained little in organization and made landfall near Port Leon, Florida, on June 9 with winds of 50 mph (85 km/h). However, the system gradually strengthened as it crossed the Florida peninsula, reentering the North Atlantic later that day. On June 10, the storm reached peak winds of 65 mph (100 km/h) prior to becoming an extratropical storm. The post-tropical cyclone then strengthened and moved erratically in open seas before entirely dissipating on June 15.

Despite the tropical storm's fast passage over land, heavy rainfall was reported, officially peaking at 14.95 in (380 mm) in Live Oak, Florida. However, unofficial reports of at least 19 in (480 mm) of rain were collected. In Perry, Florida, 100–200 families were evacuated due to the floodwater. Field crops, including tobacco and watermelon, were damaged, with flood damage estimated at $30,000. The storm also spawned ten tornadoes, with nine in northeastern Florida and one on Georgia's Jekyll Island. All of these tornadoes were relatively weak and caused minor damage, totaling to $12,000. At the coast, the tropical storm's strong winds generated waves 2–3 ft (0.61–0.91 m) high, which caused moderate damage. Though located south of where the storm made landfall, buildings and roads along the Tampa Bay Area waterfront were flooded by the waves. The cabin cruiser Kinnebar capsized in the Gulf of Mexico due to the waves, and five of the seven crew on board drowned; these were the only deaths associated with the system. Coastal damages due to storm surge amounted to $10,000, and overall the storm caused $52,000 in damages across the southeastern United States.

=== Hurricane Audrey ===
- Category 3 hurricane (SSHWS)
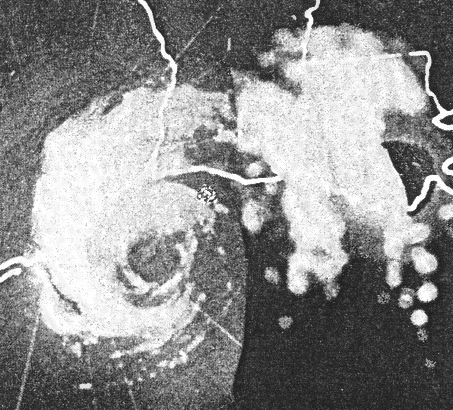
- Duration: June 24 – June 29
- Peak intensity: 125 mph (205 km/h) (1-min); 946 mbar (hPa)

An ill-defined tropical wave was first identified in the Caribbean Sea on June 20, and moved westward into the Bay of Campeche. The disturbance slowly strengthened as it developed a low pressure system. A nearby trough aided the intensification of the system, and it developed into a tropical depression on June 24, while remaining generally stationary in the Bay of Campeche. Situated in an area of favorable upper-air divergence and warm waters, the depression intensified into Tropical Storm Audrey about six hours later. Audrey began to accelerate northward due to troughing in the upper-levels in the atmosphere. The storm became a hurricane late on September 25. Audrey intensified quicker while in the northwestern Gulf of Mexico, reaching peak intensity as a Category 3 hurricane with winds of 125 mph (200 km/h) on June 27. Audrey made landfall at this intensity in extreme southwestern Louisiana very shortly thereafter. The hurricane quickly weakened as it moved inland, becoming an extratropical cyclone by June 28. The extratropical remnants soon dissipated over the Northeastern United States.

Hurricane Audrey caused widespread impacts across a wide swath of the United States and Canada. The storm's worst effects were felt in Louisiana, where the storm caused $120 million in damages. The highest storm surge measured with the hurricane was 12.4 ft (3.8 m), reported west of Cameron, Louisiana. The strong surge inundated much of the coast, killing much of the local wildlife and causing widespread property damage. Heavy rainfall also caused flooding, peaking at 10.63 in (270 mm) west of Basile, Louisiana. Rainfall was concentrated particularly in the Atchafalaya Basin. In Texas, effects of the storm were much less severe, but the storm still caused $8 million in damages, primarily as a result of strong winds. Further inland, the weakening hurricane spawned tornadoes and caused additional flooding in conjunction with a frontal boundary. The effects of Audrey were felt as far north as Canada, where 15 people died due to the strong winds and heavy rain. In total, the storm caused $152 million in damages and at least 416 deaths.

=== Tropical Storm Bertha ===
- Tropical storm (SSHWS)
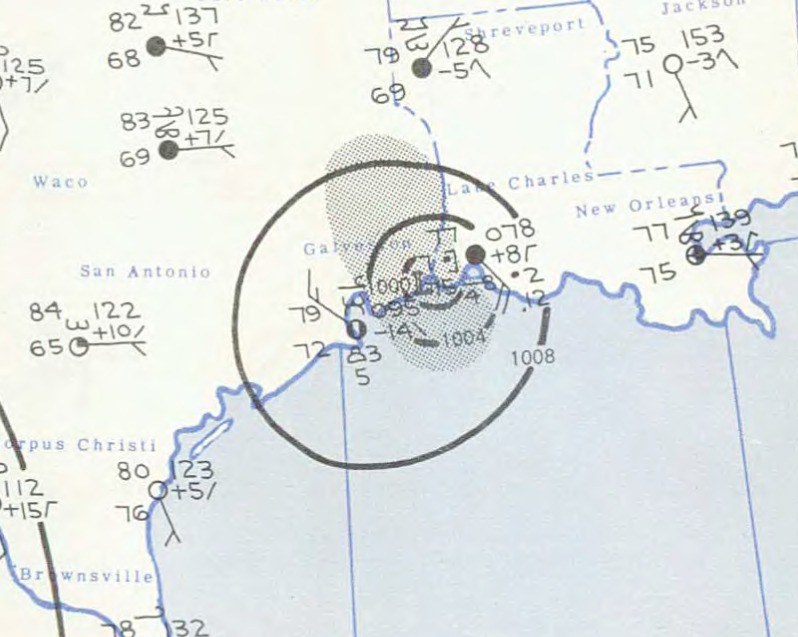
- Duration: August 8 – August 11
- Peak intensity: 65 mph (100 km/h) (1-min); 998 mbar (hPa)

A weak extratropical low entered the Gulf of Mexico on August 6 and drifted slowly westward. The system slowly organized, developing into a tropical depression on August 8 about 100 mi (160 km) southeast of the Mississippi River Delta. Moving westward, the depression intensified into Tropical Storm Bertha later on August 8. Bertha then turned northwestward and quickly organized; the system attained its peak intensity with 65 mph (105 km/h) and an estimated minimum pressure of 998 mbar (hPa; 29.47 inHg) on August 9. Early on August 10, Bertha came ashore near Cameron, Louisiana. at the same intensity. After landfall, the storm moved northward due to a strong high-pressure system and weakened over land, before degenerating into a remnant low at 0600 UTC on August 11 over Oklahoma. The storm's remnants later moved across the U.S. Interior Highlands before dissipating.

In the Gulf of Mexico, 1,350 workers on offshore oil drilling platforms were evacuated in preparation for the storm. The oil drilling tender Murmanill No. 1 sunk due to the strong waves, though the two people on board at the time were evacuated by helicopter. At the coast, the maximum storm surge height measured was 4.7 ft (1.4 m) at the Schooner Bayou Control Structure. Bertha dropped heavy rainfall primarily as a remnant low across much of The Ozarks. Rainfall peaked at 13.77 in (350 mm) near Damascus, Arkansas, which set a 24-hour rainfall record for the city and made August 1957 the wettest month on record. Across Arkansas, the heavy rains triggered flash floods after numerous rivers exceeded flood stage. The flash floods caused property damage in cities adjacent to rivers. Though damage estimates were difficult to accurately obtain, four Arkansas counties reported combined losses of $925,000, and two deaths were reported.

=== Hurricane Carrie ===
- Category 4 hurricane (SSHWS)
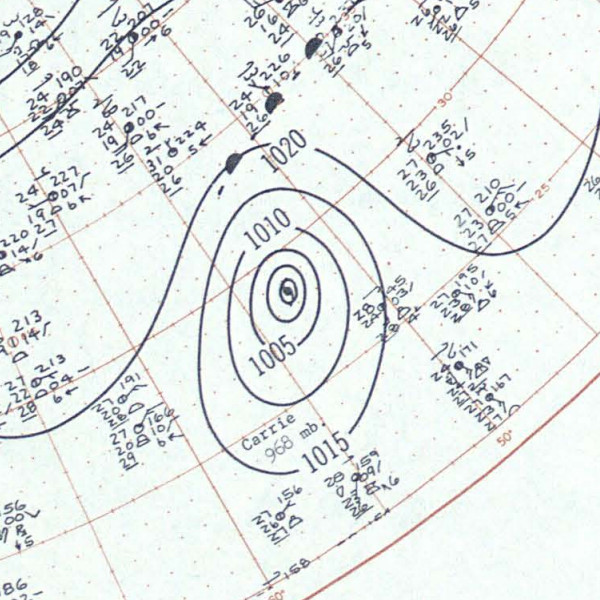
- Duration: September 2 – September 23
- Peak intensity: 140 mph (220 km/h) (1-min); 945 mbar (hPa)

An easterly tropical wave spawned a tropical depression near the Cabo Verde Islands on September 2. The depression moved generally west-northwestward and became Tropical Storm Carrie on September 3, before becoming a hurricane on September 5. Carrie intensified further, before reaching peak intensity on early September 8 as a Category 4 hurricane with maximum sustained winds of 140 mph (225 km/h) in the open Atlantic Ocean. The hurricane curved northward and fluctuated in intensity, bottoming out at Category 1 intensity early on September 10. After turning northward on September 11, the storm began re-strengthening, reaching a secondary peak as a Category 3 hurricane on September 13. However, the storm soon began slowly weakening, falling to Category 2 intensity shortly before curving west-northwestward on September 14. Although Carrie threatened Bermuda, the storm passed northeast of the island and then turned in a general eastward direction by September 17. Carrie accelerated northeastward by September 22 and passed through the Azores over of close to Terceira Island as a Category 1 hurricane. The storm transitioned into an extratropical cyclone on September 23, prior to affecting areas of the British Isles. The extratropical system dissipated near the southwestern tip of England on September 25.

Due to its distance away from any major land masses, Carrie caused relatively minor damage along its path. On September 16, the hurricane passed well north of Bermuda, causing minimal damage despite its intensity at the time, though hurricane reconnaissance flights in the area were postponed due to damage sustained by one of the aircraft. As it was transitioning into an extratropical cyclone southwest of the Azores, the German ship Pamir encountered the storm and capsized on September 21, resulting in the deaths of 80 crew members on board. On September 23, Carrie completed its extratropical transition. As an extratropical storm, Carrie brought strong storm surge and heavy rain to the British Isles, which claimed three lives. The hurricane's long duration and path in open water also helped it attain a number of Atlantic hurricane records.

=== Tropical Storm Debbie ===
- Tropical storm (SSHWS)
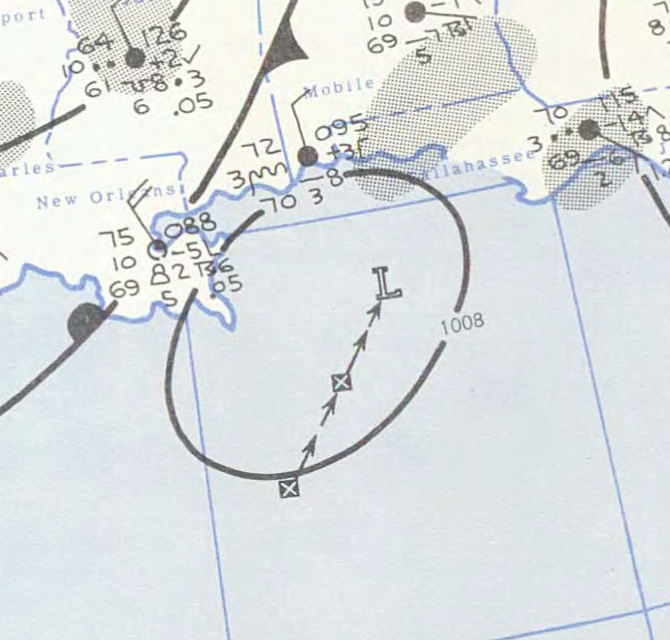
- Duration: September 7 – September 9
- Peak intensity: 40 mph (65 km/h) (1-min); 1003 mbar (hPa)

On September 5, a weak easterly wave moved into the Gulf of Mexico from the Caribbean Sea due to the influence of an upper-level trough. The wave organized and spawned a weak area of circulation which developed into a tropical storm by 0600 UTC on September 7. Moving steadily towards the northeast at roughly 15 mph (25 km/h), Debbie only marginally strengthened due to the presence of cooler air entrainment. Late on September 8, Debbie made landfall near Fort Walton Beach, Florida as a minimal tropical storm with winds of 40 mph (65 km/h). A minimum barometric pressure of 1005 mbar (hPa; 29.68 inHg) was recorded in Pensacola, Florida. The tropical storm weakened as it moved over land, degenerating to a tropical depression on September 9. The system became increasingly diffuse, and later merged with strong weather systems by 0600 UTC later that day.

Offshore, the tropical storm generated high tides 2.5–4 ft (0.76–1.22 m) above average in Apalachee Bay, located about 150 mi (240 km) east of where Debbie made landfall. The strong surf caused some localized flooding. In St. Marks, Florida, a station recorded maximum sustained winds of 40 mph (65 km/h), the highest measured in association with the storm. However, a station in Tampa, Florida recorded a peak wind gust of 52 mph (84 km/h) in a squall. Heavy rainfall caused widespread flooding, though rainfall was mostly beneficial to crops. Rainfall peaked at 11.26 in (286 mm) in Wewahitchka, Florida, while precipitation was reported as far north as Pennsylvania. The tropical storm only caused minor damage, but was indirectly responsible for four deaths.

=== Tropical Storm Esther ===
- Tropical storm (SSHWS)
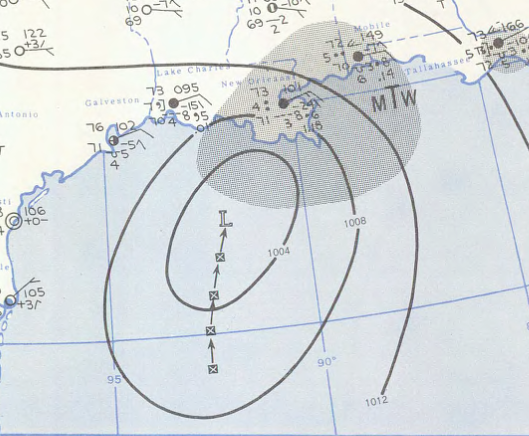
- Duration: September 16 – September 19
- Peak intensity: 65 mph (100 km/h) (1-min); 1000 mbar (hPa)

On September 12, a mid-level circulation area formed over Nicaragua and slowly drifted northeastward into the Gulf of Mexico. As it entered the Gulf, the system developed thunderstorm activity and an area of low pressure, and as a result the Weather Bureau began initiating advisories on a newly formed tropical depression on September 16. The depression quickly intensified and attained tropical storm strength. Esther continued to strengthened, reaching a minimum pressure of 1000 mbar (hPa; 29.53 inHg) early on September 18, as reported by a hurricane reconnaissance flight. Shortly thereafter, the large tropical storm peaked with sustained winds of 65 mph (105 km/h) as it made landfall to the southwest of Dulac, Louisiana. Esther weakened over land and later dissipated over the Mississippi Valley by 1200 UTC on September 19.

Like Tropical Storm Debbie, which had made landfall just a week prior in the same area, Esther's wind impacts were minimal. The strongest gust measured associated with the storm was 75 mph (121 km/h), as recorded at Pensacola International Airport. Other locations reported similar gusts and strong winds in squalls. Heavy rains persisted in the region well after Esther moved inland, resulting in high rainfall amounts. Rainfall peaked at 18.39 in (467 mm) in Quarantine, Louisiana, near the mouth of the Mississippi River. The heavy rains breached several levees, resulting in severe flooding, particularly in Buras, Louisiana. Although rainfall was beneficial in many places due to an existing drought, cotton, pecan, and peanut crops were damaged by the floods. While crop damage amounted to $1 million, property damage amounted to $1.5 million. Esther also caused three indirect deaths, all of which were in Louisiana.

=== Hurricane Frieda ===
- Category 1 hurricane (SSHWS)
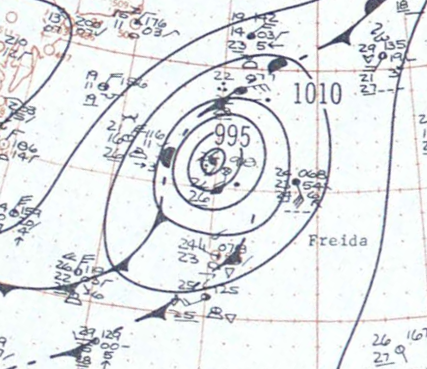
- Duration: September 20 – September 26
- Peak intensity: 85 mph (140 km/h) (1-min); 975 mbar (hPa)

On September 20, a low pressure area developed within the same frontal boundary that had curved Hurricane Carrie towards the Azores. Rapidly developing, the system was classified as a tropical depression at 1200 UTC later that day, southwest of Bermuda. Initially, the depression was ill-defined and was slowly moving to the southwest. The following day, the attached cold front dissipated, allowing for the system to intensify. The system was subsequently upgraded a tropical storm by September 22, following a reconnaissance flight into the system which reported a minimum pressure of 1001 mbar (hPa; 29.56 inHg). At the time, however, Frieda was a small system with minimal shower activity. Gradually strengthening, Frieda reached an initial peak intensity with winds of 60 mph (95 km/h) later that day. Following the split of an upper-level ridge to the north, Frieda recurved towards the northeast the next day. As it sped to the northeast, a westerly shortwave progressed eastward, enhancing environmental conditions. As a result, the tropical storm began to quickly strengthen. By 1200 UTC on September 25, Frieda attained hurricane strength, and reached peak intensity with winds of 80 mph (130 km/h) and a minimum pressure of 992 mbar (hPa; 29.30 inHg), as reported by the Canadian merchant ship Irvingbrook. However, a cold front associated with the shortwave encountered the hurricane, which caused it to transition into an extratropical cyclone on September 26. Frieda's extratropical remnants later passed over Newfoundland. Though Frieda remained far from any land masses, a peak rainfall amount of 3.26 in (83 mm) was measured in Bermuda.

=== Unnamed October tropical storm ===
- Tropical storm (SSHWS)
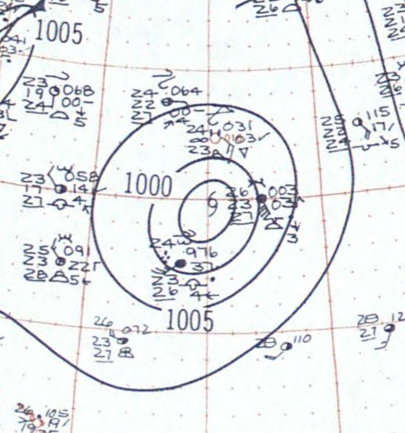
- Duration: October 23 – October 27
- Peak intensity: 60 mph (95 km/h) (1-min); 991 mbar (hPa)

On October 22, an area of thunderstorm activity developed north of the Lesser Antilles, and barometric pressures fell throughout the region. The following day, a cut-off low developed and strengthened along the edge of a trough extending from Bermuda. This justified the classification of the system as a tropical depression on October 23, 500 mi (800 km) northeast of Puerto Rico. Moving towards the west, the depression attained tropical storm strength shortly after formation. A ship reported a minimum pressure of 999 mbar (hPa; 29.50 inHg) in the storm's vicinity. The large system gradually strengthened the following day, reaching its peak intensity by 1800 UTC on October 24. A ship reported a minimum pressure of 993 mbar (hPa; 29.33 inHg) early the next day, the lowest pressure measured in association with the tropical storm. At the same time, the tropical storm also recurved towards the northeast. Heading towards more northerly latitudes, a gradual weakening trend began, due to the presence of an extratropical system. The tropical storm was itself absorbed by the same system on October 27. This storm may not have been named operationally due to a lack of discernible tropical characteristics.

== Storm names ==
The following list of names was used for named storms (tropical storms and hurricanes) that formed in the North Atlantic in 1957. This was a completely new set of names, thus every name used this season was used for the first (and only, in the case of Audrey) time.

- Audrey
- Bertha
- Carrie
- Debbie
- Esther
- Frieda
- Gracie (unused)
- Hannah (unused)
- Inga (unused)
- Jessie (unused)
- Kathie (unused)
- Lisa (unused)
- Margo (unused)
- Netty (unused)
- Odelle (unused)
- Patty (unused)
- Quinta (unused)
- Roxie (unused)
- Sandra (unused)
- Theo (unused)
- Undine (unused)
- Venus (unused)
- Wenda (unused)
- Xmay (unused)
- Yasmin (unused)
- Zita (unused)

=== Retirement ===
Due to the extensive damage and high fatalities, the name Audrey was retired by the U.S. Weather Bureau after the 1957 season. The name will never be used to name another Atlantic hurricane.

== See also ==
- 1957 Pacific hurricane season
- 1957 Pacific typhoon season
- Australian region cyclone seasons: 1956–57 1957–58
- South Pacific cyclone seasons: 1956–57 1957–58
- South-West Indian Ocean cyclone seasons: 1956–57 1957–58
