= Hurricane Carrie =

Category 4 Atlantic hurricane in 1957

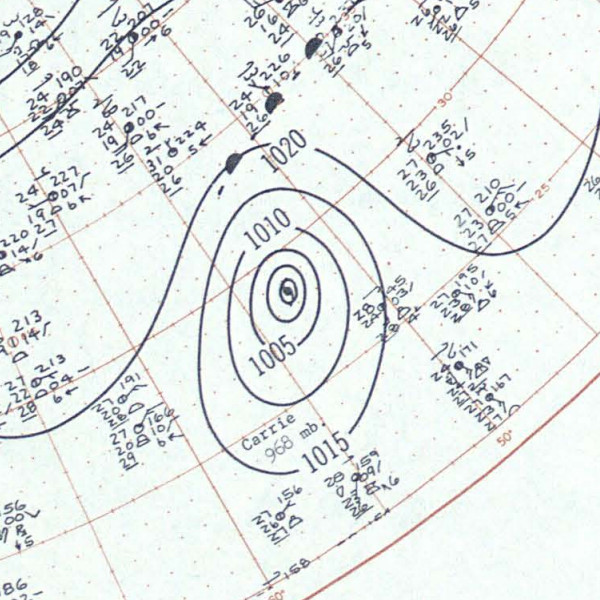
- Surface analysis of Hurricane Carrie on September 14

Meteorological history
- Formed: September 2, 1957
- Extratropical: September 23, 1957
- Dissipated: September 28, 1957

Category 4 major hurricane
- 1-minute sustained (SSHWS/NWS)
- Highest winds: 140 mph (220 km/h)
- Lowest pressure: 945 mbar (hPa); 27.91 inHg

Overall effects
- Fatalities: 83
- Areas affected: Bermuda, Azores, British Isles, France
- IBTrACS
- Part of the 1957 Atlantic hurricane season

Hurricane Carrie was a deadly and long-lived Category 4 major hurricane which was the strongest tropical cyclone of the 1957 Atlantic hurricane season and one of the longest-lasting tropical cyclones in the North Atlantic basin. The third named storm and second hurricane of the year, Carrie formed from an easterly tropical wave off the western coast of Africa on September 2, a type of tropical cyclogenesis typical of Cape Verde-type hurricanes. Moving to the west, the storm gradually intensified, reaching hurricane strength on September 5. Carrie intensified further, before reaching peak intensity on September 8 as a Category 4 hurricane with maximum sustained winds of 140 mph (220 km/h) in the open Atlantic Ocean. The hurricane curved northwards and fluctuated in intensity as it neared Bermuda on September 14. However, Carrie passed well north of the island and turned to the northeast towards Europe. Weakening as it reached higher latitudes, the storm transitioned into an extratropical cyclone on September 23, prior to affecting areas of the British Isles, and subsequently dissipated on September 28.

Due to its distance away from any major land masses, Carrie caused minimal damage along its path. On September 16, the hurricane passed well north of Bermuda, causing minimal damage despite its intensity at the time, though hurricane reconnaissance flights in the area were postponed due to damage sustained by one of the aircraft. As it transitioned into an extratropical cyclone southwest of the Azores, the German ship Pamir encountered the storm and capsized on September 21, resulting in the deaths of 80 crew members on board. As an extratropical storm, Carrie brought strong storm surge and heavy rain to the British Isles, claiming three lives. The hurricane's long duration and path in open water helped it attain several Atlantic hurricane records.

== Meteorological history ==
Map plotting the storm's track and intensity, according to the Saffir–Simpson scale Map key Saffir–Simpson scale Tropical depression (≤38 mph, ≤62 km/h) Tropical storm (39–73 mph, 63–118 km/h) Category 1 (74–95 mph, 119–153 km/h) Category 2 (96–110 mph, 154–177 km/h) Category 3 (111–129 mph, 178–208 km/h) Category 4 (130–156 mph, 209–251 km/h) Category 5 (≥157 mph, ≥252 km/h) Unknown Storm type Tropical cyclone Subtropical cyclone Extratropical cyclone, remnant low, tropical disturbance, or monsoon depression

In early September, a trough was identified along the western coast of Africa. Moving towards the west as a result of a strong Azores High, the disturbance passed over Cape Verde on September 2. Observations from weather stations evidenced cyclonic rotation in the region. An airplane belonging to Panair do Brasil passed within the vicinity of the vorticity and as a result reported the formation of a tropical storm. In HURDAT—the official database listing all known Atlantic tropical cyclones since 1851—the system was listed to have reached tropical depression intensity at 0600 UTC that day.

The depression continued to steadily intensify as it moved westwards, later reaching the equivalent of a modern-day Category 1 hurricane by 0600 UTC on September 5. On September 6, the ship African Star encountered the hurricane 700 mi (1,100 km) west of Cape Verde. Reported winds of 92 mph (148 km/h) and a minimum pressure of 1001 mbar (hPa; 29.56 inHg) confirmed the existence of the tropical cyclone. A Weather Bureau forecaster remarked that the hurricane was in a "blind spot" at the time due to its location outside of shipping lanes and Hurricane Hunter reconnaissance missions. Throughout the day, the hurricane intensified, reaching major hurricane intensity by 0000 UTC on September 7. Shortly after, a United States Air Force reconnaissance flight headed for Bermuda was diverted to observe the hurricane. The flight reported a well-defined eye measuring 20 mi (32 km) across and a minimum pressure of 945 mbar (hPa; 27.91 inHg), the lowest measured in relation to the hurricane. At the time, Carrie had maximum sustained winds of 135 mph (217 km/h), equivalent to a modern-day Category 4 hurricane. Further strengthening ensued, and the hurricane peaked in intensity on September 8 with winds of 140 mph (230 km/h).

After reaching peak intensity on September 8, Carrie began to gradually weaken due to a decreasing pressure gradient caused by a trough that had cut through the Azores High. By September 11, the hurricane had degenerated into a Category 1 hurricane. A reconnaissance flight reported a minimum pressure of 984 mbar (hPa; 29.06 inHg). At the same time, Carrie began to slowly curve towards the north in response to the trough. The storm later began to slowly reintensify, reattaining major hurricane strength by 1200 UTC on September 13. The restrengthening of the subtropical ridge on September 14 caused the hurricane to quickly curve towards the northwest. National Hurricane Research Project (NHRP) observers described the hurricane as "one of the most perfectly formed hurricanes they had seen." Carrie began to steadily weaken again beginning on September 15. As it passed north of Bermuda the following day, weather radar imagery from the island indicated that the hurricane had an ill-defined structure, with its eye having expanded to 40–70 mi (64–113 km) in diameter. However, as it curved and accelerated eastward in response to a second trough of low pressure, Carrie maintained hurricane intensity up until September 23, when it transitioned into an extratropical cyclone. The remnant system continued eastwards until it dissipated over Ireland by 1800 UTC on September 28.

== Preparations, impact, and records ==
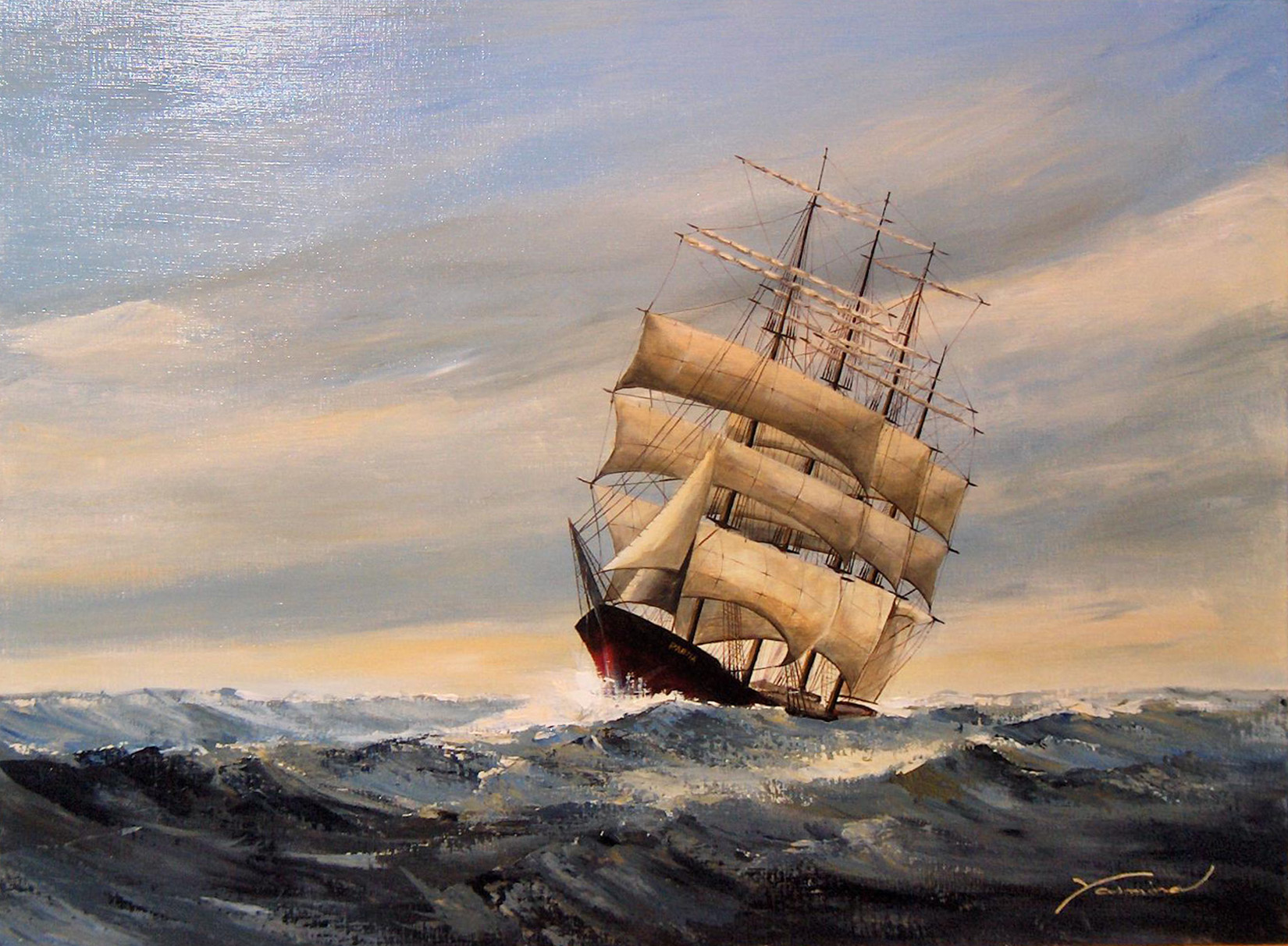
Painting of the Pamir by Yasmina (2008)

=== Preparations and impact ===
After reports confirmed the existence of a hurricane in the eastern Atlantic, the Weather Bureau warned shipping lanes in the storm's path. Small craft warnings were issued for offshore areas from Block Island, Rhode Island south to Savannah, Georgia on September 7 due to the threat of rough seas. After Carrie stalled on September 11, the Weather Bureau gave Florida a slight chance of being affected by the storm, but the possibilities of the storm affecting the peninsula decreased after the hurricane curved northwards. After the storm was forecast to potentially impact Bermuda, schools were closed in preparation for Carrie, while vessels were warned of the oncoming hurricane. Most planes in Kindley Air Force Base on the island were evacuated, with the remaining planes weighted down by sandbags. After passing Bermuda, the storm was forecast to strike Nova Scotia, but instead Carrie curved towards the northeast.

As the U.S. Air Force was maintaining continuous reconnaissance of the hurricane using converted Boeing B-50 Superfortresses, one of the planes lost an engine and was forced to fly back to West Palm Beach, Florida for repairs. Four other undamaged aircraft were called back to West Palm Beach, including a crippled ship, while two other B-50s were held at Bermuda. Passing well north of the island on September 16, effects of Carrie on Bermuda were minimal, with peak gusts reaching only 35 mph (56 km/h).

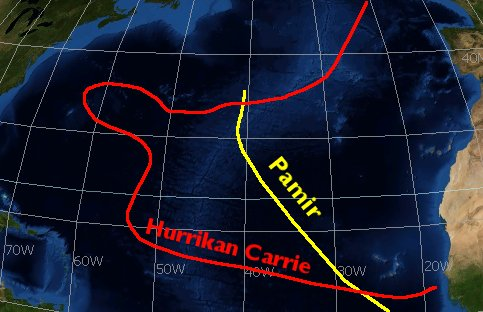
Approximate course of Pamir and track of Hurricane Carrie in September 1957

The German barque Pamir, en route from Buenos Aires to Hamburg, Germany, encountered the hurricane southwest of the Azores on September 21 while carrying barley cargo. The ship sank due to the effects of Carrie, and 80 people out of the 86 crew members on board the ship perished. The final message received from the Pamir was a distress call and indicated that the ship had lost all of its sails and had been listing at a 45° angle. A search and rescue operation ensued after the loss of the ship was reported, involving the U.S. Air Force and Navy, as well as the British Air Force and Navy. Other ships from Canada and Portugal were also involved in the search. All associated groups were inconclusive in their findings, with no sign of debris left from the ship. However, two lifeboats and a raft were found, but they were empty. As an extratropical storm, Carrie impacted the Azores, though damages, if any, remain unknown. The extratropical remnants of Carrie later struck the British Isles on September 24 and 25, causing strong winds, waves, and severe flooding. Winds from the system were estimated at 50 mph (80 km/h). The strong waves caused extensive property damage and killed three.

=== Records ===
Lasting as a hurricane for 20.75 days, Carrie was at the time tied for second in terms of longest-existing Atlantic tropical cyclones, alongside the ninth hurricane of the 1893 Atlantic hurricane season and behind the 1899 San Ciriaco hurricane. Due to the hurricane's long duration, the Weather Bureau office in San Juan, Puerto Rico issued 62 advisories on the storm, which was at the time the most ever issued in association with an Atlantic hurricane. Carrie's long duration and distance from any land masses also contributed to its record travel distance of 6,000 mi (9,700 km). Hurricane reconnaissance flights throughout Carrie's existence traveled further east than any previous flight due to the storm's location far from any land masses. The initial flight on September 7 covered 3,700 mi (6,000 km) and lasted for nearly 17 hours.

== See also ==
- List of Atlantic hurricanes
- List of Category 4 Atlantic hurricanes
