= 1957 Pacific hurricane season =

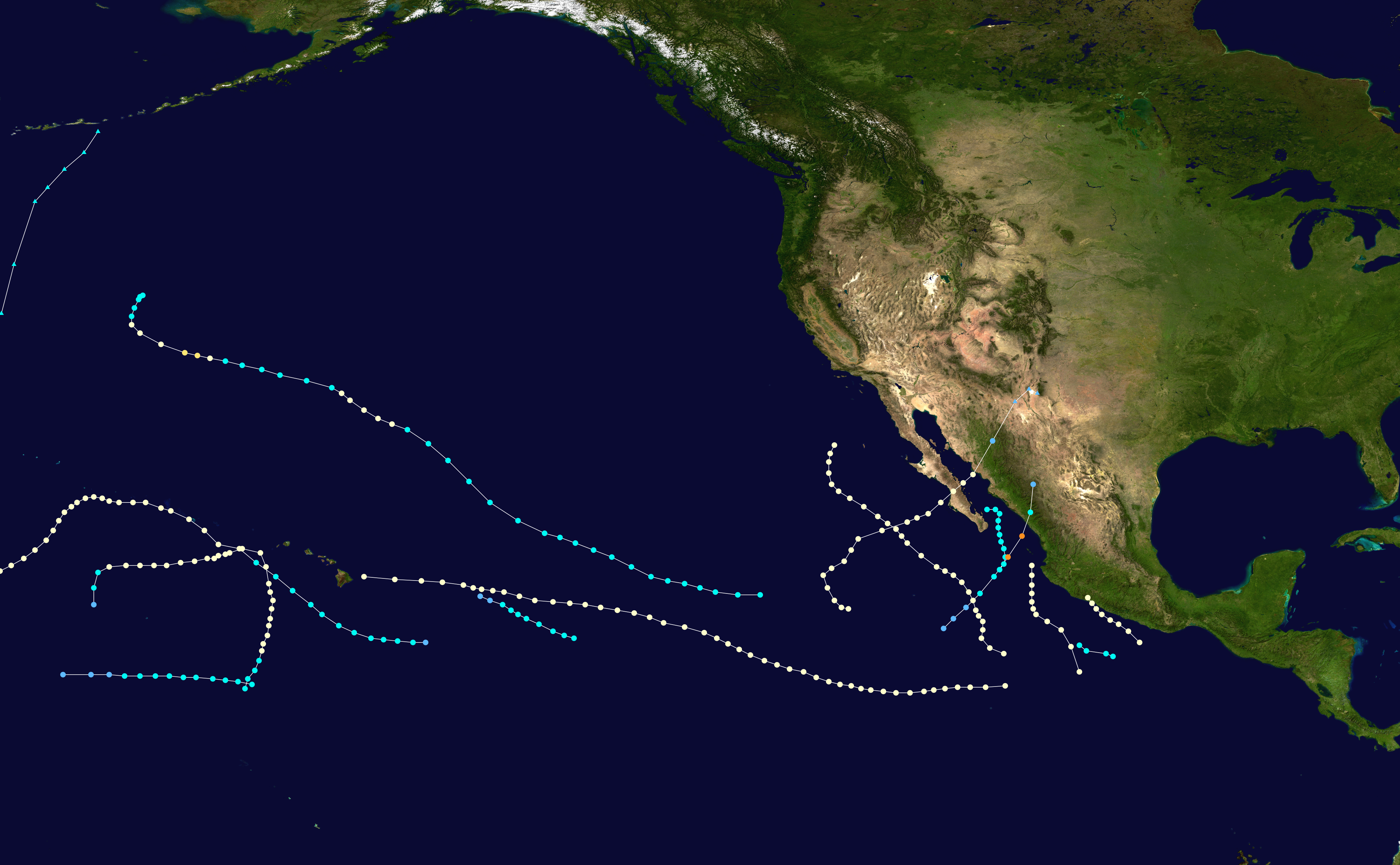
- Season summary map

Seasonal boundaries
- First system formed: July 15, 1957
- Last system dissipated: December 6, 1957

Strongest storm
- Name: Hurricane Twelve
  - Maximum winds: 140 mph (220 km/h) (1-minute sustained)
  - Lowest pressure: 959 mbar (hPa; 28.32 inHg)

Seasonal statistics
- Total storms: 13
- Hurricanes: 9
- Major hurricanes (Cat. 3+): 1
- Total fatalities: 19 direct, 2 indirect
- Total damage: $8.1 million (1957 USD)

Related articles
- 1957 Atlantic hurricane season; 1957 Pacific typhoon season; 1950s North Indian Ocean cyclone seasons

The 1957 Pacific hurricane season was a moderately active year in which 13 tropical cyclones formed. The hurricane season ran through the summer and fall months which conventionally delimit the period during which most tropical cyclones form in the northeastern Pacific Ocean. The first tropical cyclone developed on July 15. The final storm dissipated on December 6, becoming one of the few Pacific storms to exist outside of the seasonal dates. Of the season's 13 storms, five of these formed or crossed into the central Pacific.

During the season, five storms impacted land. Hurricane Twelve was the deadliest, leaving eight casualties in Mazatlán and the costliest was Hurricane Nina, causing an estimated $100,000 in losses. In addition to the damage, four people were killed by Nina in Hawaii. Hurricane Six killed seven people and Hurricane Ten killed two in Mexico.

== Systems ==
=== Hurricane Kanoa ===
- Category 1 hurricane (SSHWS)
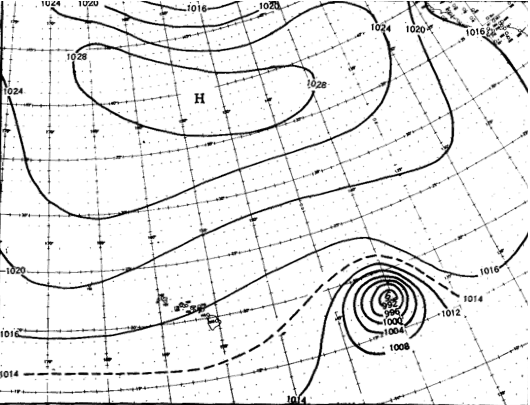
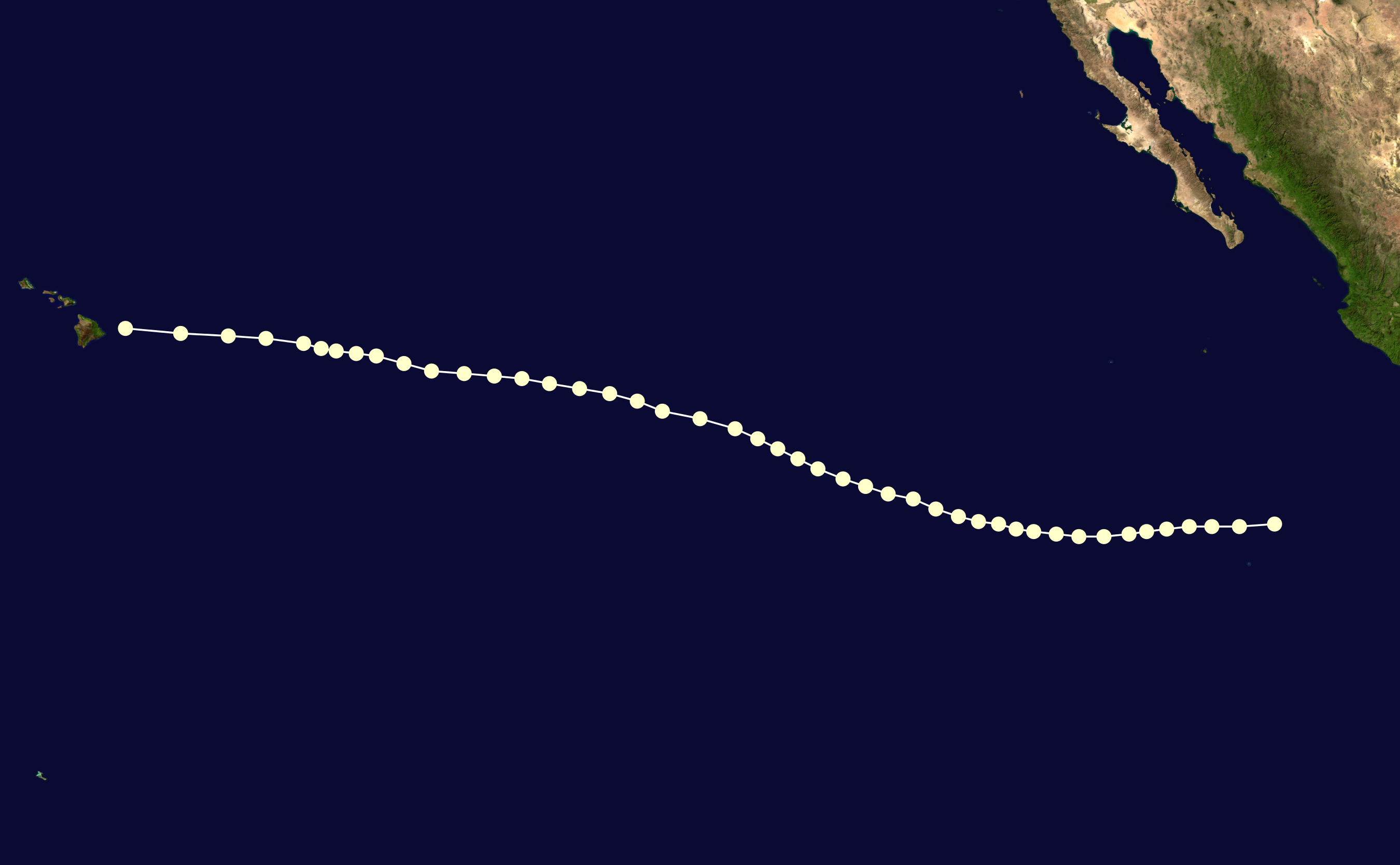
- Duration: July 15 – July 26
- Peak intensity: 85 mph (140 km/h) (1-min); 985 mbar (hPa)

The first hurricane of the season was identified by the National Weather Bureau in San Francisco, California on July 15. The previous day, the S.S. Garvel Park recorded sustained winds of 50 mph (80 km/h) when it was situated roughly 75 mi (120 km) south of Manzanillo, Mexico. Although listed as a Category 1 hurricane for its entire known existence by the hurricane database, the storm was not confirmed to have attained hurricane intensity until July 21. The storm took a steady westward track during the early portion of its existence in response to a strong ridge located north of Hawaii. On July 18, the National Weather Bureau discontinued advisories on the storm as no information on it was being received.

On July 21, a vessel named Cape Horn relayed information regarding the storm to the National Weather Bureau, leading to them re-issuing advisories on the storm, upgrading it to a hurricane. The following day, a reconnaissance mission from Oahu, Hawaii located the storm's 40 mi (65 km) wide eye and recorded sustained winds of 80 mph (130 km/h) and gusts up to 115 mph (185 km/h). Shortly after, the storm likely attained its peak intensity as a high-end Category 1 hurricane, with winds of 85 mph (135 km/h). Early on July 23, warning responsibility of the storm was given to the National Weather Bureau in Honolulu, Hawaii.

Upon transferring responsibility, the hurricane was given the name Kanoa, the Hawaiian name meaning "the free one". As the storm approached Hawaii, it began to weaken as convection filled the eye. The storm's track mirrored that of the shipping lane between the Panama Canal and Hawaii, leading to several ships being affected. Colder air also began to enter the circulation, leading to further weakening. By the time the system reached Hawaii, it was no more than an area of disturbed weather. The remnants of Kanoa persisted until July 26, at which time they dissipated over the Hawaiian Islands. The remnants of the storm brought beneficial rainfall to most of Hawaii, with heavy rains being reported in parts of the Big Island.

=== Hurricane Two ===
- Category 2 hurricane (SSHWS)
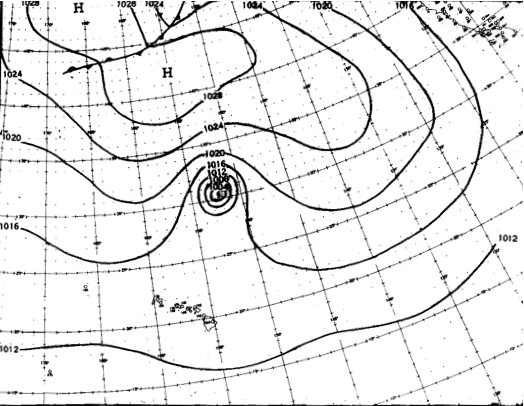
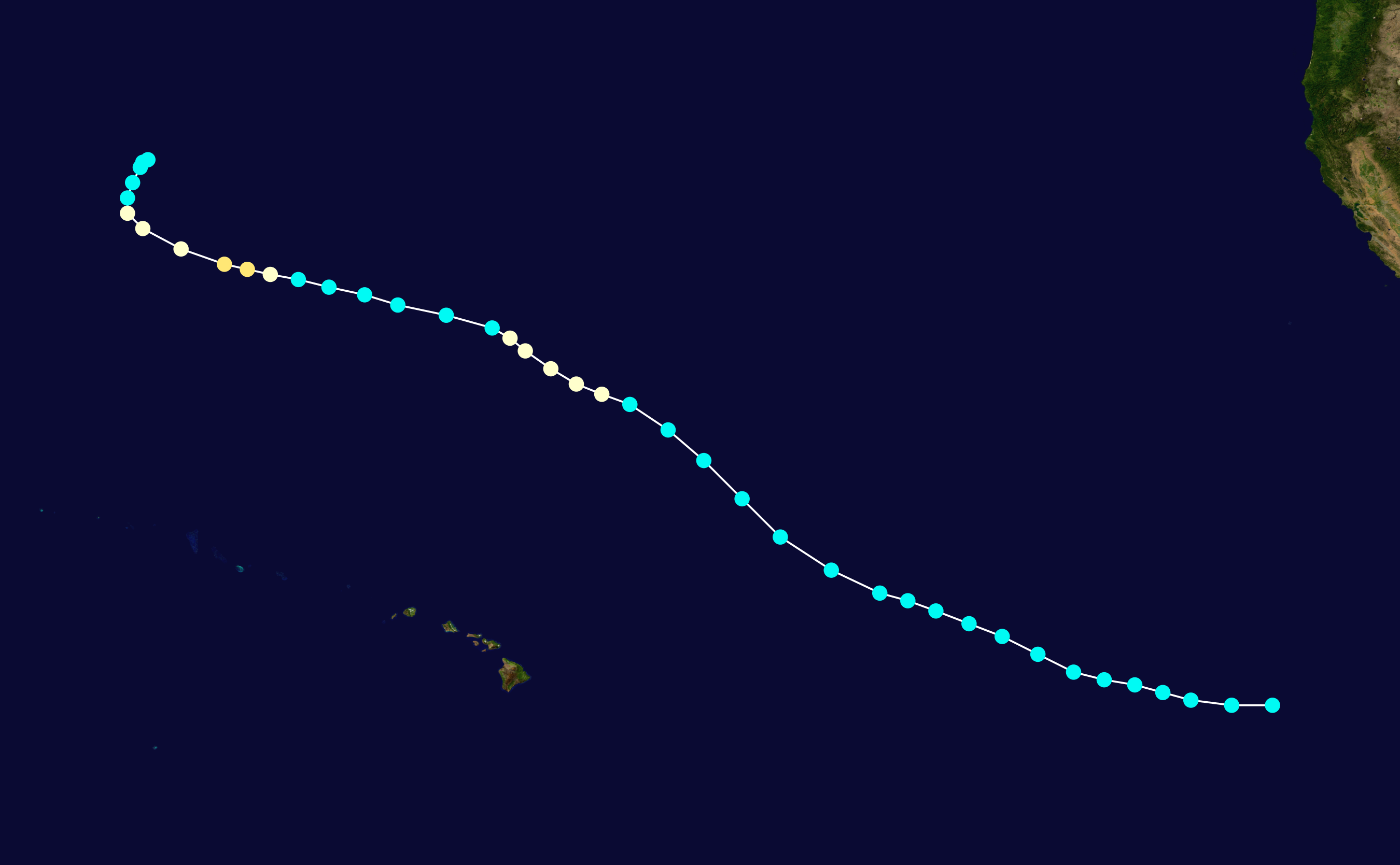
- Duration: August 6 – August 16
- Peak intensity: 105 mph (165 km/h) (1-min); 987 mbar (hPa)

Roughly two weeks after Kanoa dissipated, the season's second hurricane was identified over the open waters of the eastern Pacific on August 6. This storm traveled in a similar fashion to Kanoa in response to a high-pressure system over the northern Pacific. By August 9, the system turned northwest and weakened. Cold, dry air began to enter the storm as it accelerated over cooler waters. Several reconnaissance missions were flown into the storm due to rapid changes in the storm's wind field and structure. Late on August 10, the system intensified into a Category 1 hurricane and its forward motion slowed as it turned more westward.

Although at an unusual latitude, the storm maintained this intensity for over a day before weakening to a tropical storm. During the afternoon of August 13, the small system re-intensified into a hurricane. Reconnaissance reported that gale-force winds extended no more than 100 mi (160 km) from the storm's eye. Shortly thereafter, the system further intensified into a Category 2 hurricane, attaining maximum winds of 105 mph (170 km/h). Weather maps at the time depicted the storm as having a minimum pressure of 987 mbar (hPa). By August 14, the storm began to weaken once more, gradually becoming a tropical storm on August 15. After turning northward, the cyclone became extratropical at a high latitude of 39.8°N.

=== Hurricane Three ===
- Category 1 hurricane (SSHWS)
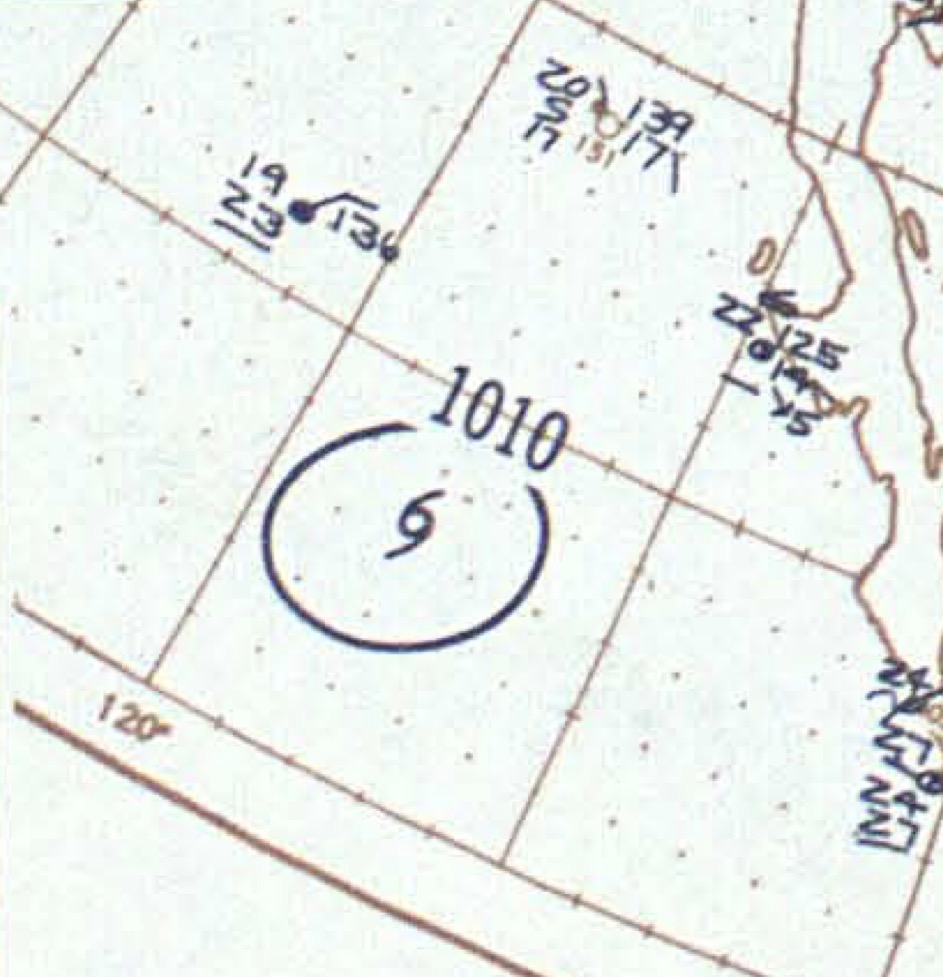
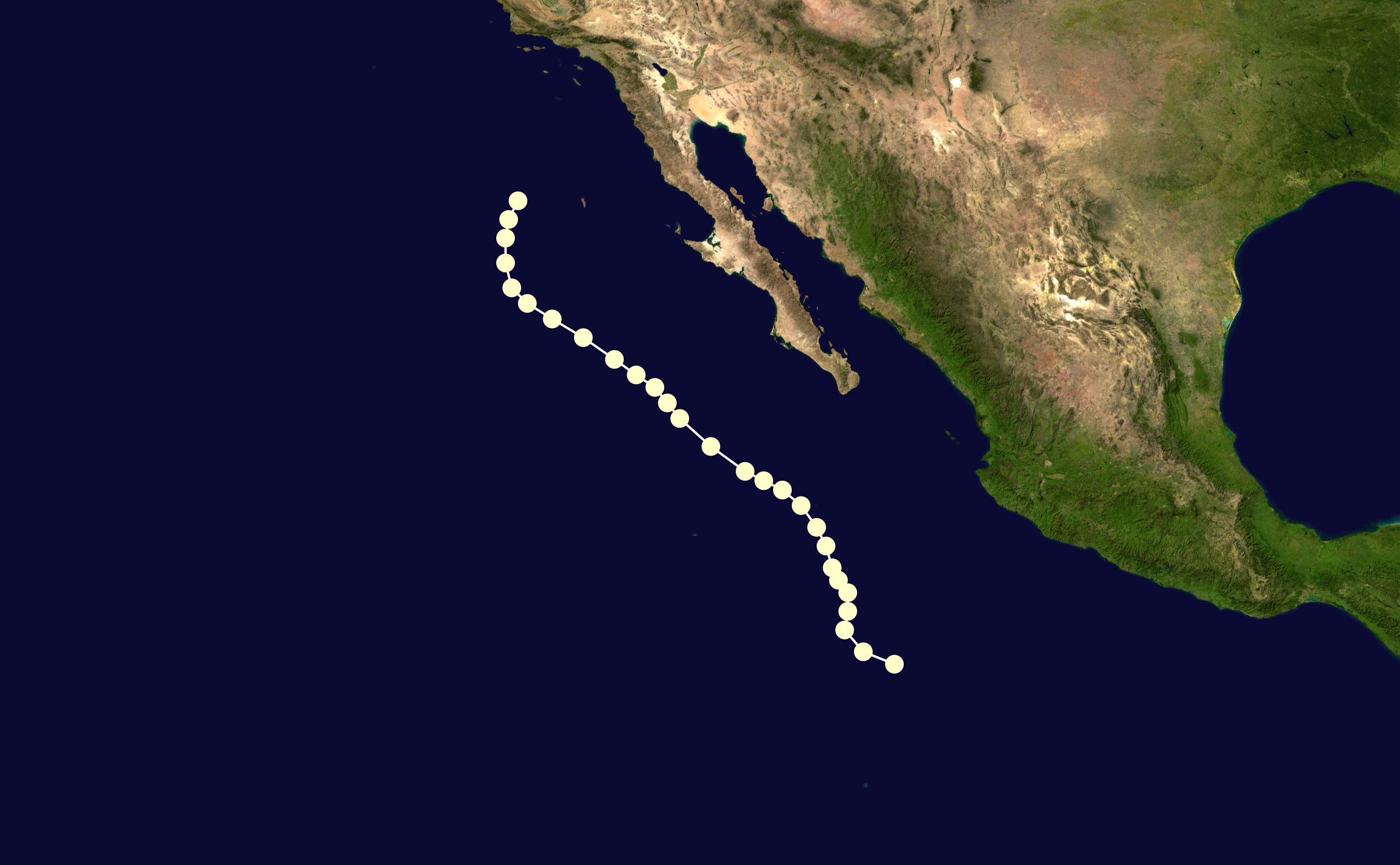
- Duration: August 9 – August 15
- Peak intensity: 85 mph (140 km/h) (1-min); 972 mbar (hPa)

As Hurricane Two intensified over open waters, the season's third storm was identified on August 9. Initially tracking westward, the hurricane turned sharply north, maintaining an intensity of 85 mph (135 km/h) during its known existence. Briefly slowing on August 11, the system quickly picked up forward speed as it turned northwestward, paralleling the coastline of the Baja California Peninsula. On August 14, the hurricane turned north once more; however, it lost its identity the following day off the coast of Baja California.

=== Hurricane Della ===
- Category 1 hurricane (SSHWS)
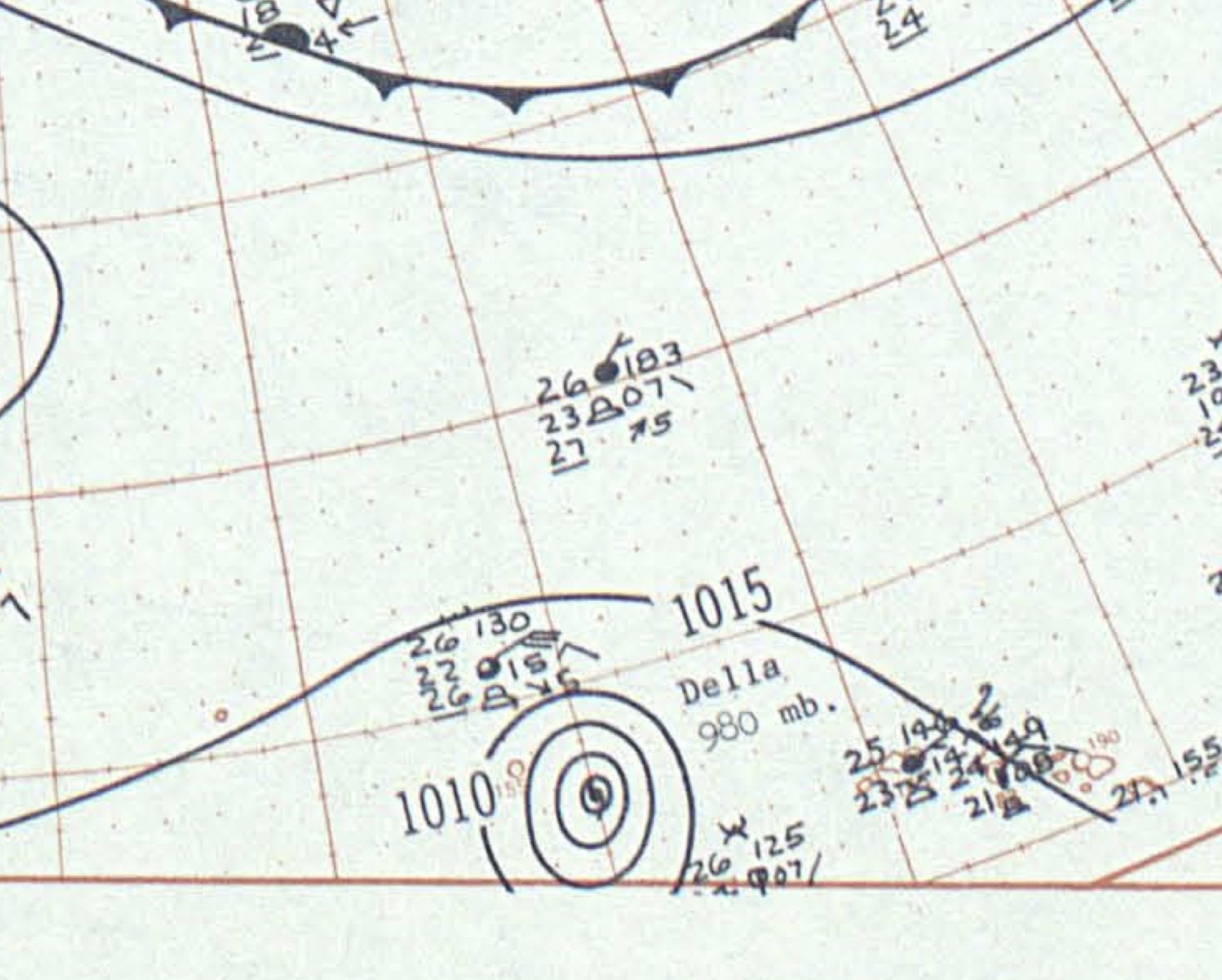
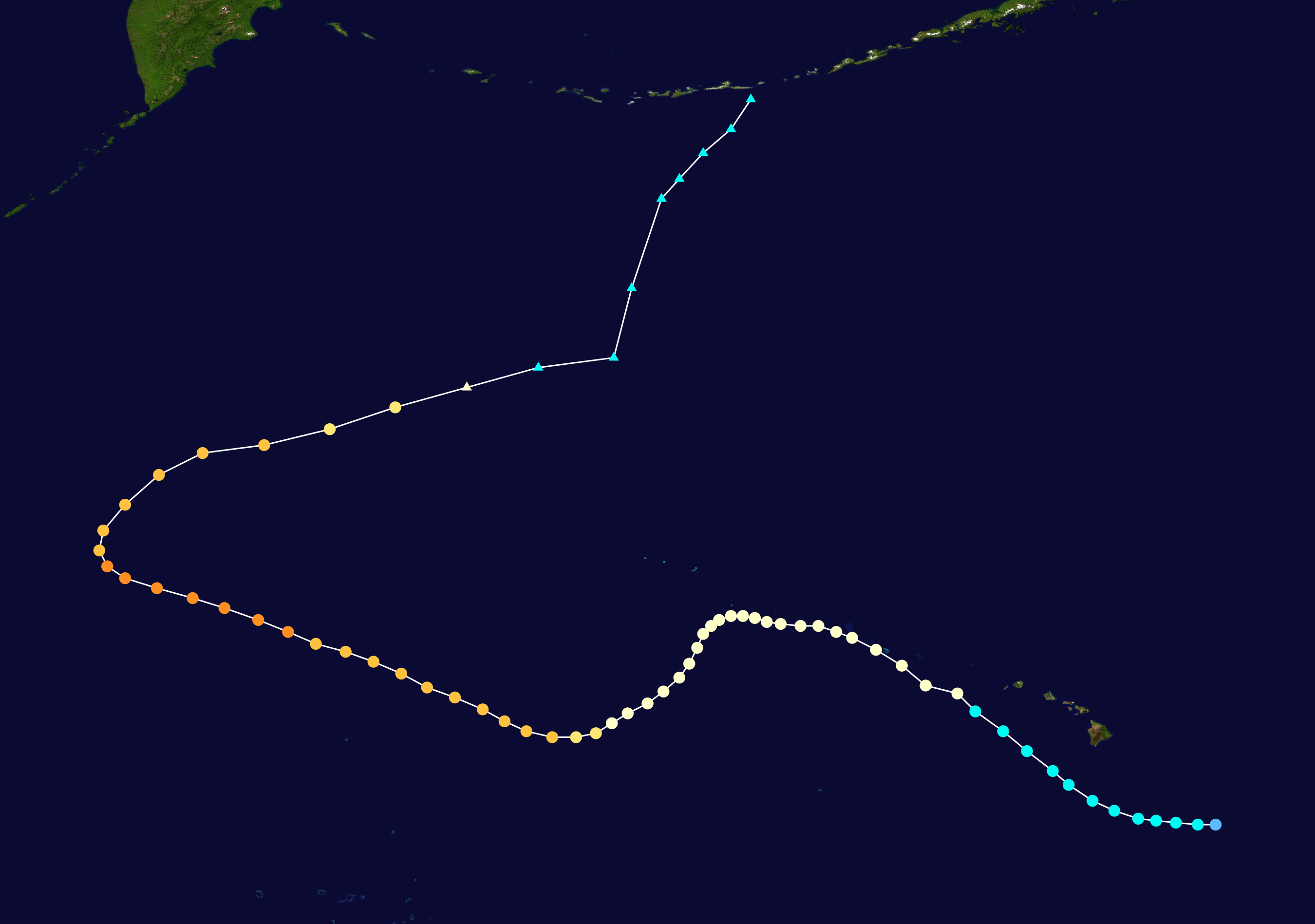
- Duration: September 1 – September 9 (Exited basin)
- Peak intensity: 85 mph (140 km/h) (1-min); 980 mbar (hPa)

Hurricane Della was first identified on September 1 southeast of Hawaii as a tropical depression. The depression quickly intensified into a tropical storm as it traveled northwest; however, operational advisories were not issued until September 3. By that time, a ship reported they had encountered a storm and recorded winds of 100 mph (160 km/h). Radar images also depicted an eye had developed within the storm. After becoming a hurricane, Della began a gradual turn towards the southwest. During the day on September 4, the storm passed roughly 10 mi (15 km) south of the French Frigate Shoals, bringing strong winds gusting up to 110 mph (175 km/h). During the storm's passage, a pressure of 980 mbar (hPa) was recorded, the lowest in relation to the storm. By September 9, Della began to turn westward as it approached the International Date Line with winds of 85 mph (135 km/h).

During the day, the storm crossed 180°, entering the western Pacific basin and being re-designated as a typhoon. The storm tracked steadily northwestward, attaining a peak intensity of 125 mph (200 km/h), a high-end Category 3 storm, before turning back towards the east. The storm gradually weakened, transitioning into an extratropical cyclone on September 17 and again crossing the International Date Line. The system dissipated shortly thereafter over open waters. Throughout its existence, Hurricane/Typhoon Della traveled roughly 5,000 mi (8,000 km), the longest known track of any Pacific hurricane at the time.

=== Tropical Storm Five ===
- Tropical storm (SSHWS)
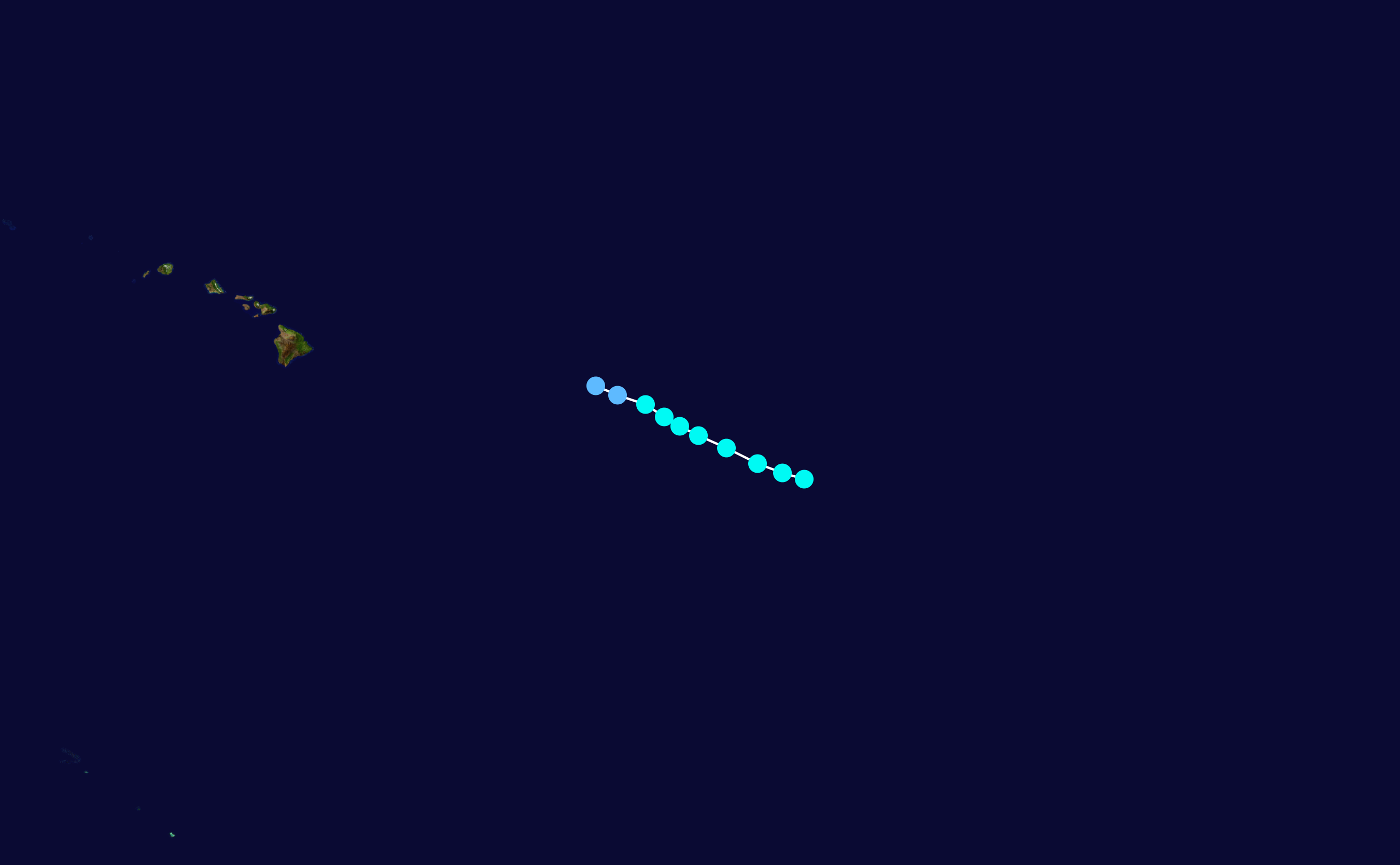
- Duration: September 9 – September 11
- Peak intensity: 50 mph (85 km/h) (1-min);

The fifth tropical cyclone of the season was first identified as a tropical storm several hundred miles southeast of Hawaii on September 9. The storm quickly attained winds of 50 mph (80 km/h) before weakening. By September 11, the system weakened to a tropical depression. Later that day, the system entered an area with no ships available for reporting. However, no ships reported a storm in the region for several days, signifying the depression's dissipation.

=== Hurricane Six ===
- Category 1 hurricane (SSHWS)
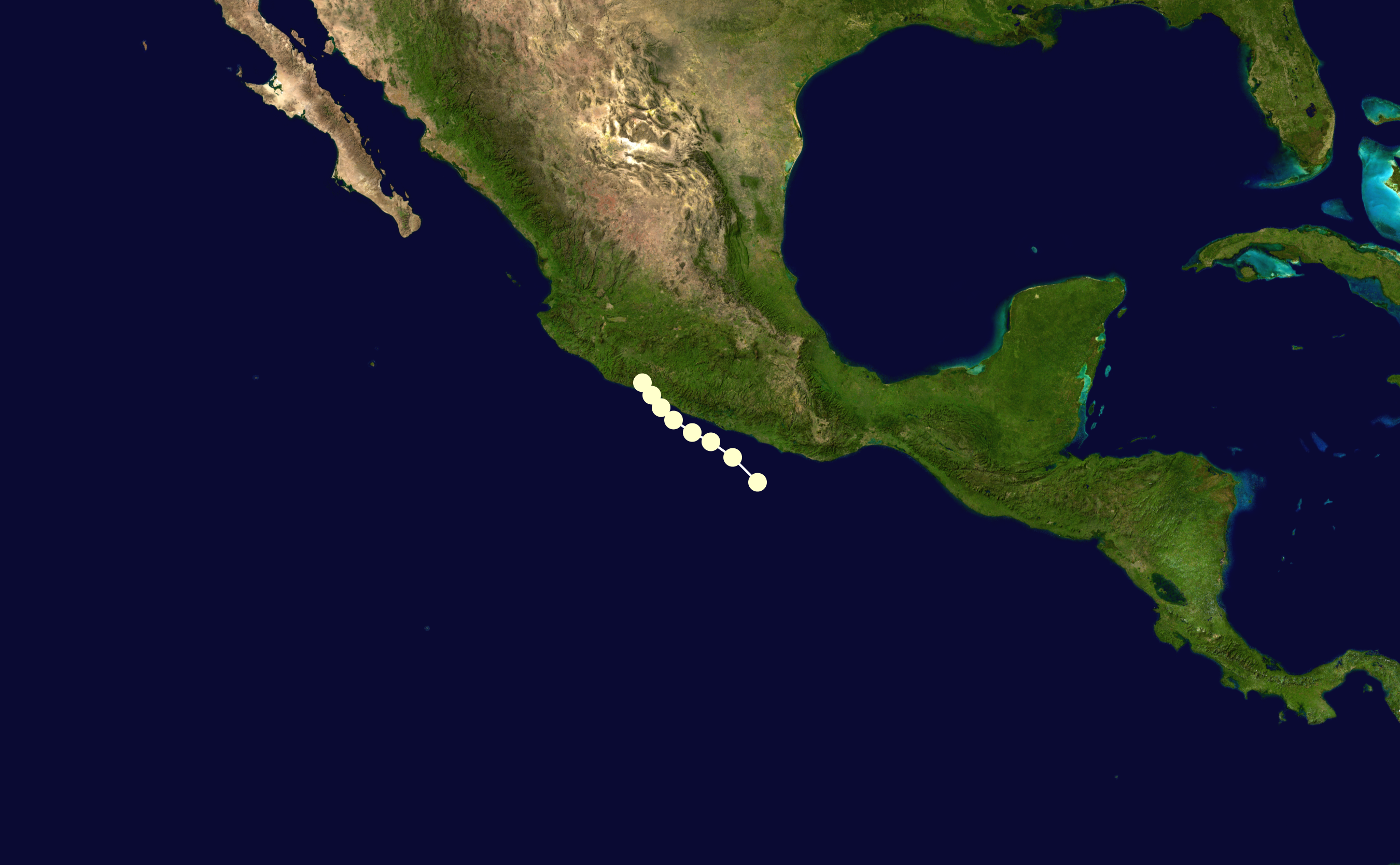
- Duration: September 17 – September 18
- Peak intensity: 85 mph (140 km/h) (1-min); 984 mbar (hPa)

On September 17, a new hurricane was identified just off the southern coast of Mexico with winds of 85 mph (135 km/h). Moving northwestward, the storm eventually made landfall near Acapulco, Mexico at this intensity. Shortly after moving over land, the storm lost its identity.

High winds and heavy rains from the storm caused moderate damage to structures and vessels throughout Acapulco, Mexico. Several roads were washed out or flooded by the storm. Seven people were killed throughout the region by the storm, including one U.S. citizen who was electrocuted by a downed power line.

=== Tropical Storm Seven ===
- Tropical storm (SSHWS)
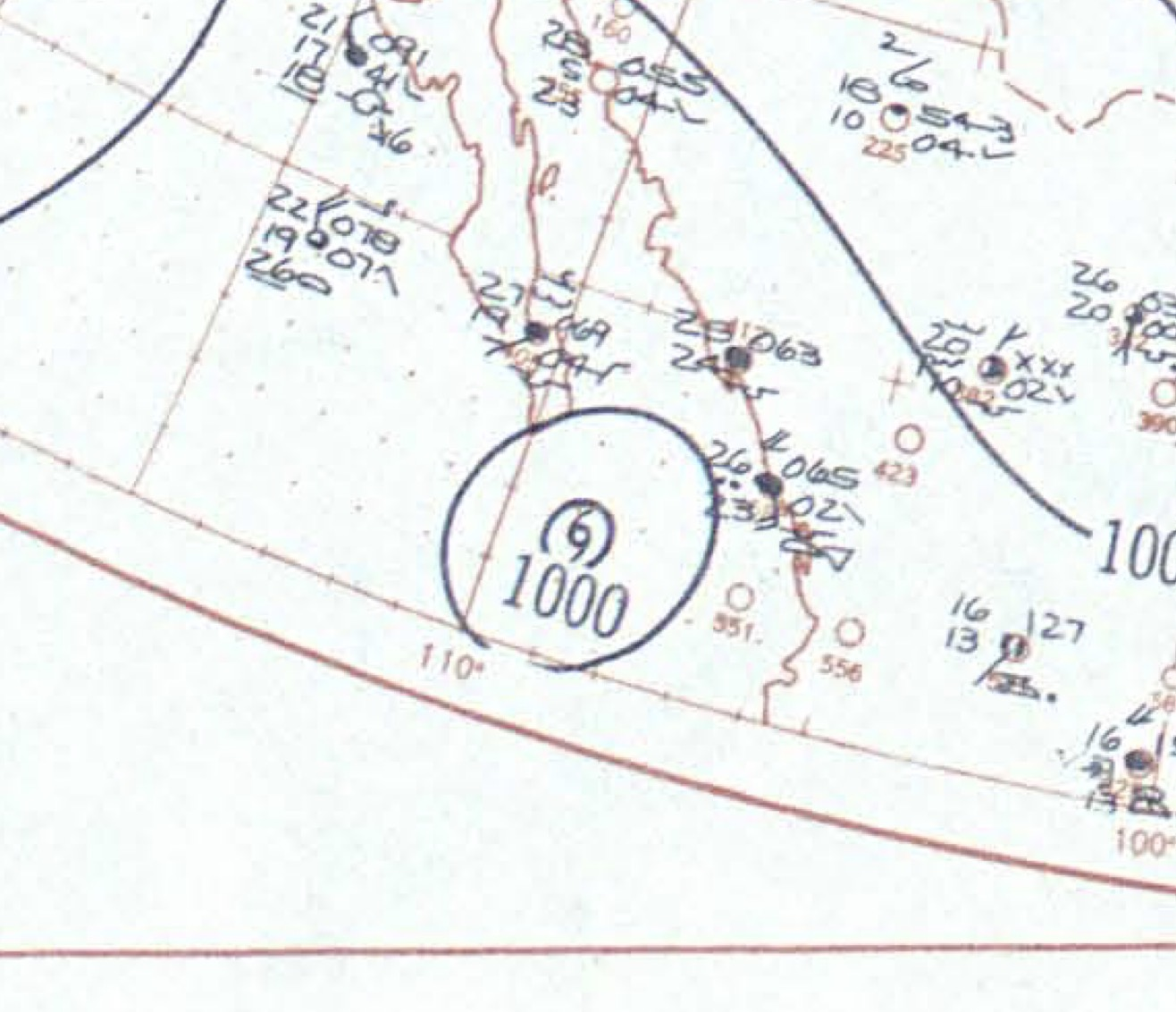
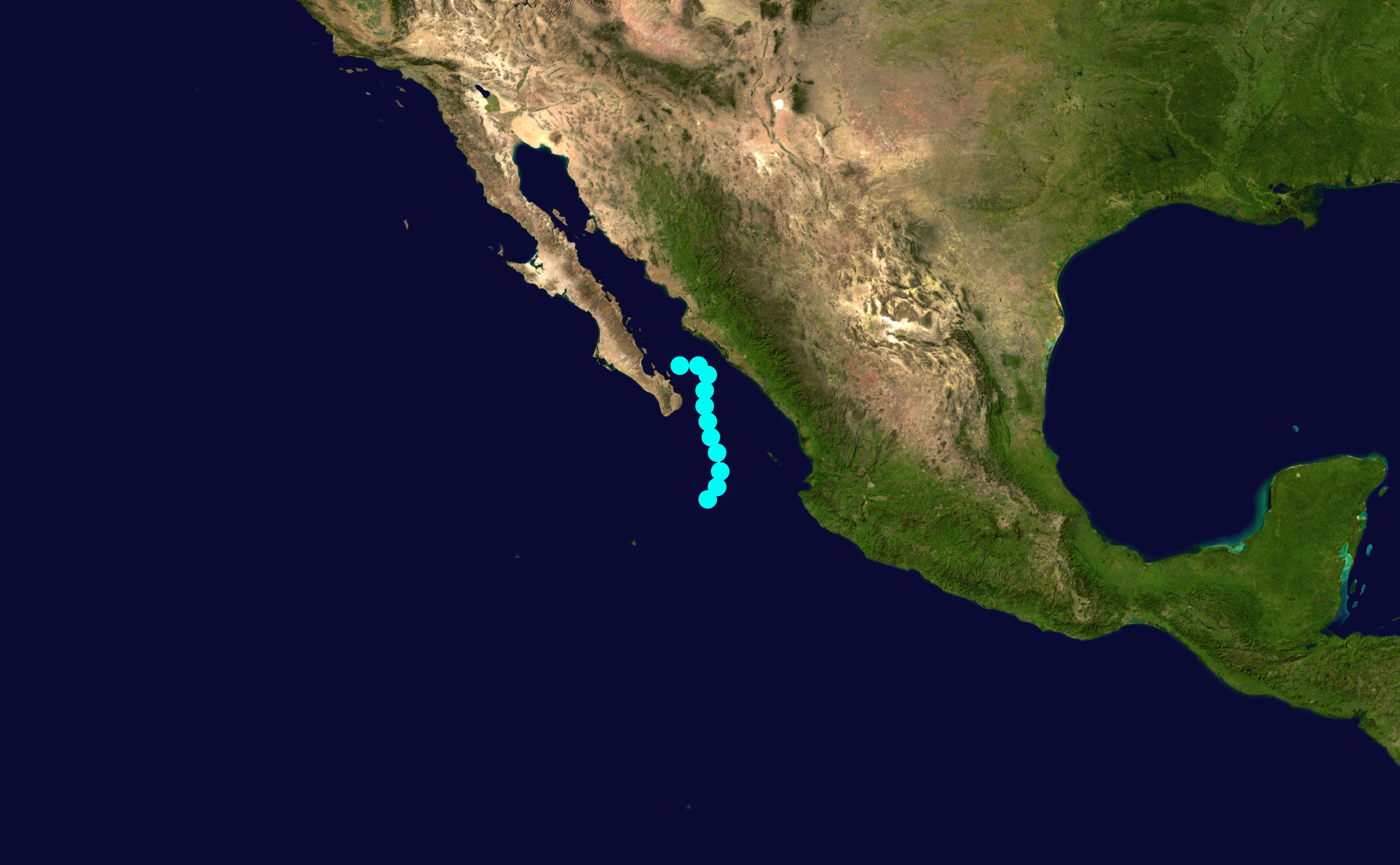
- Duration: September 20 – September 23
- Peak intensity: 50 mph (85 km/h) (1-min); 991 mbar (hPa)

Several days after Hurricane Six lost its identity over Mexico, a new tropical storm formed near the southern edge of the Gulf of California on September 20. Some forecasters stated that the system may have been the remnants of the preceding storm which regenerated. However, the Hurricane Database did not confirm this. The system tracked nearly due north, attaining maximum winds of 50 mph (80 km/h), nearing the coastline of Mexico several times. However, the storm did not make landfall during its existence. On September 22, it turned westward before dissipating just off the coast of Baja California Sur.

=== Tropical Storm Eight ===
- Tropical storm (SSHWS)
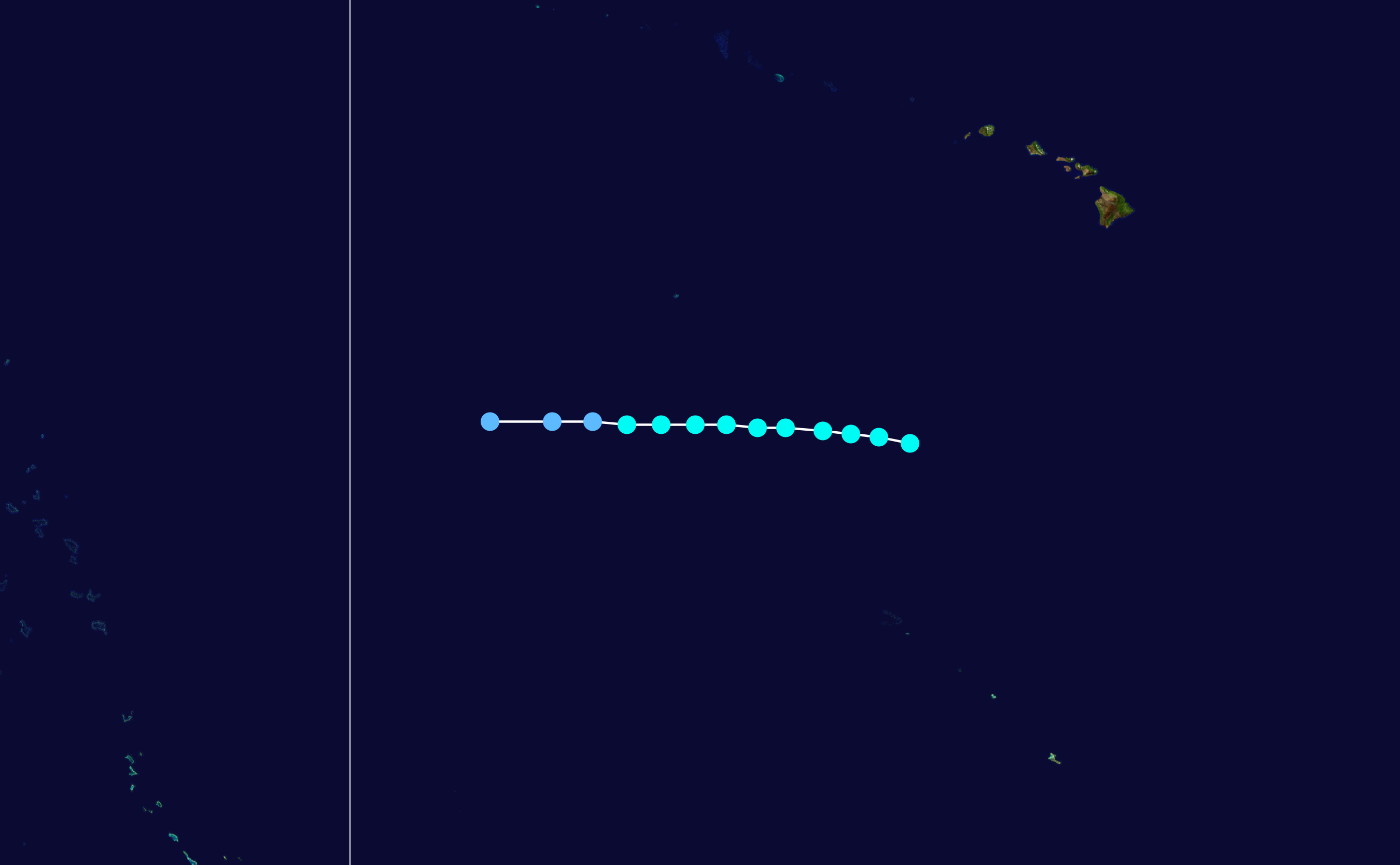
- Duration: September 25 – September 28
- Peak intensity: 50 mph (85 km/h) (1-min);

The fifth tropical cyclone to form or enter the central Pacific was first identified on September 25 several hundred miles south of the Hawaiian Islands. Traveling nearly due west, the storm attained an intensity of 50 mph (80 km/h) before weakening. By September 27, the storm weakened to a tropical depression and later dissipated on September 28 over open waters.

=== Tropical Storm Nine ===
- Tropical storm (SSHWS)
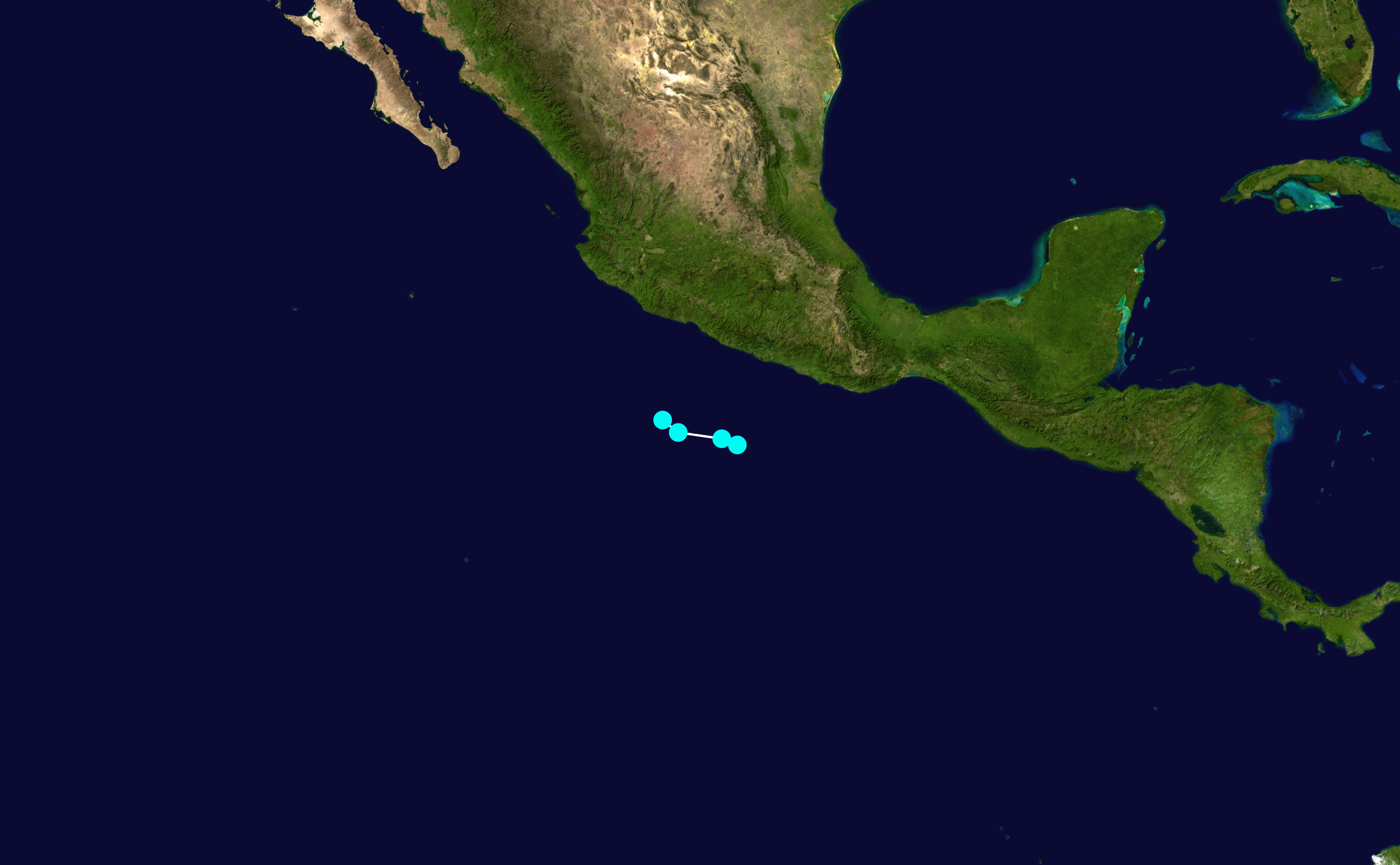
- Duration: September 26 – September 27
- Peak intensity: 50 mph (85 km/h) (1-min); 999 mbar (hPa)

The shortest lived storm of the season, Tropical Storm Nine, formed south of Mexico on September 26. The system attained peak winds of 50 mph (80 km/h) during its existence. Later that day, the center of the storm relocated several dozen miles to the west. Shortly thereafter, the storm dissipated on September 27 over open waters.

=== Hurricane Ten ===
- Category 1 hurricane (SSHWS)
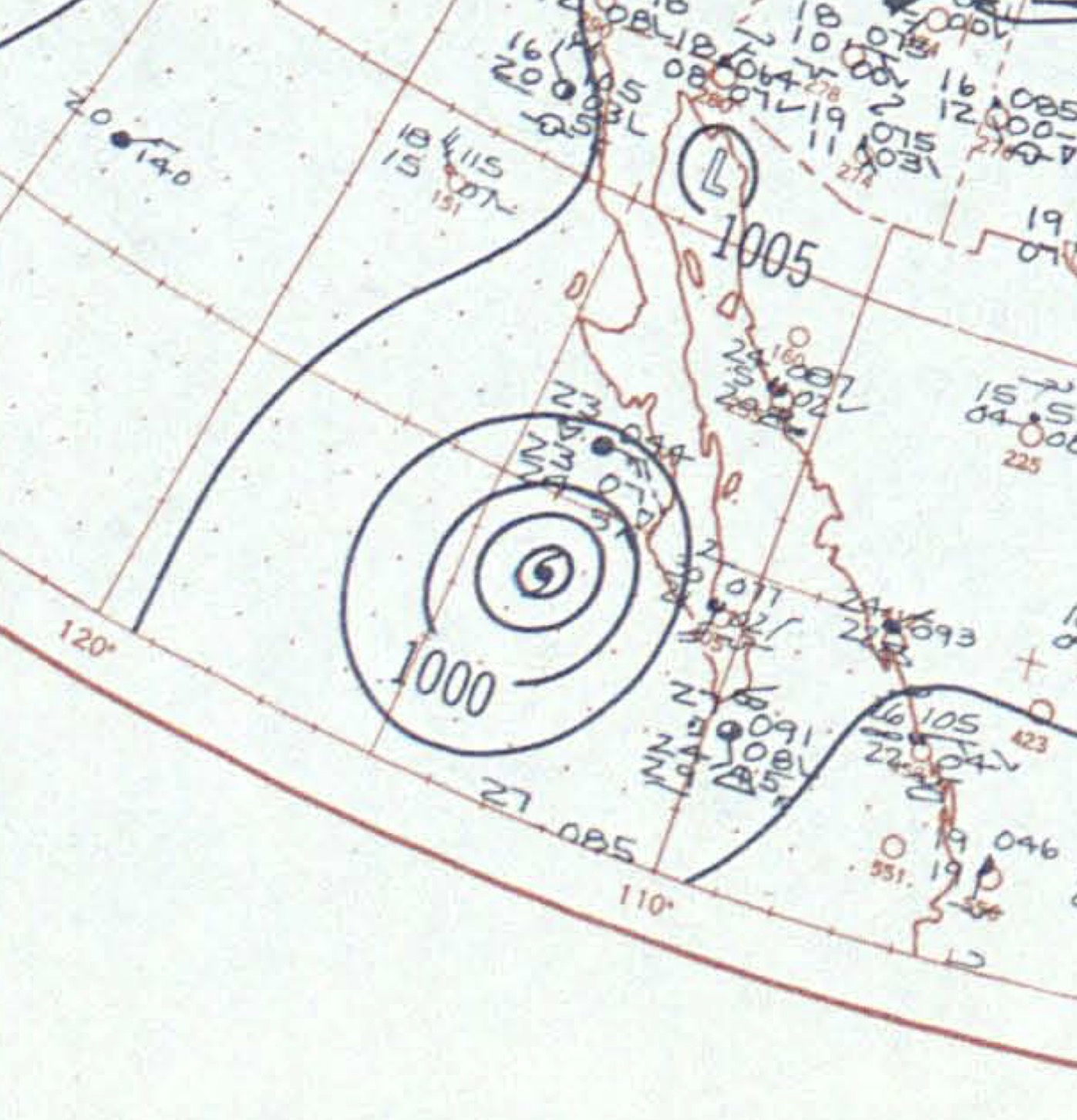
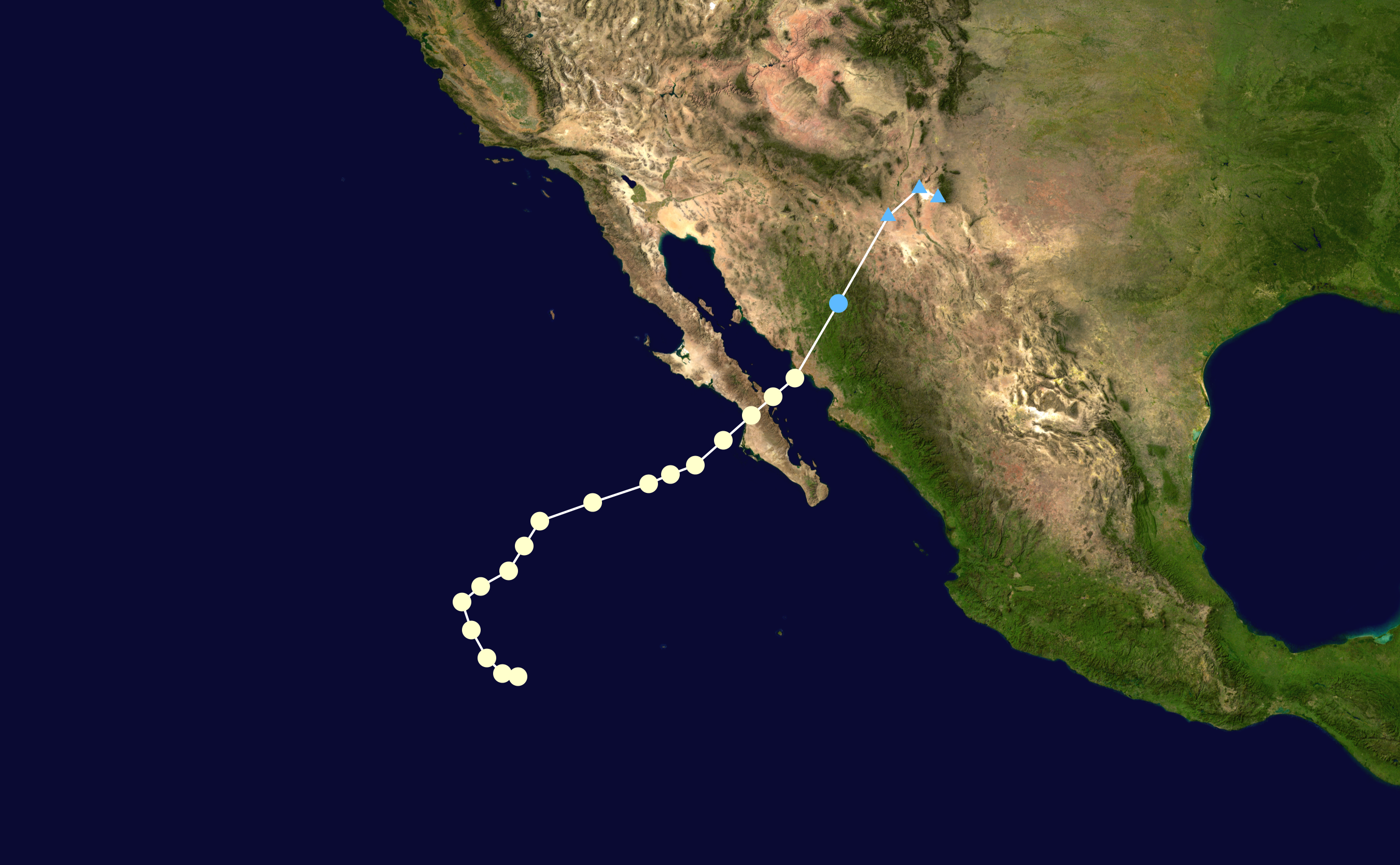
- Duration: October 1 – October 6
- Peak intensity: 85 mph (140 km/h) (1-min); 996 mbar (hPa)

The tenth known storm of the season was identified on October 1 several hundred miles southwest of the tip of the Baja California Peninsula. Maximum winds observed during the storm's existence reached 85 mph (135 km/h); however, no air pressure was recorded. Initially tracking westward, the system turned northwest and later northeast by October 3. After a brief acceleration on October 4, the hurricane slowed as it neared the coastline of Baja California. Early on October 5, the storm crossed the Peninsula as a Category 1 hurricane before entering the Gulf of California. The hurricane made another landfall near Navojoa, Mexico later that day. Rapid weakening took place as the storm moved over the high terrain over northern Mexico. Early on October 6, the system transitioned into an extratropical cyclone over New Mexico before dissipating several hours later.

At least two people were killed after their home collapsed on them a result of the storm in Mexico. Severe cotton crop damage was reported in the Mexican states of Sonora and Baja California Sur and bridges were washed away by flood waters.

=== Hurricane Eleven ===
- Category 1 hurricane (SSHWS)
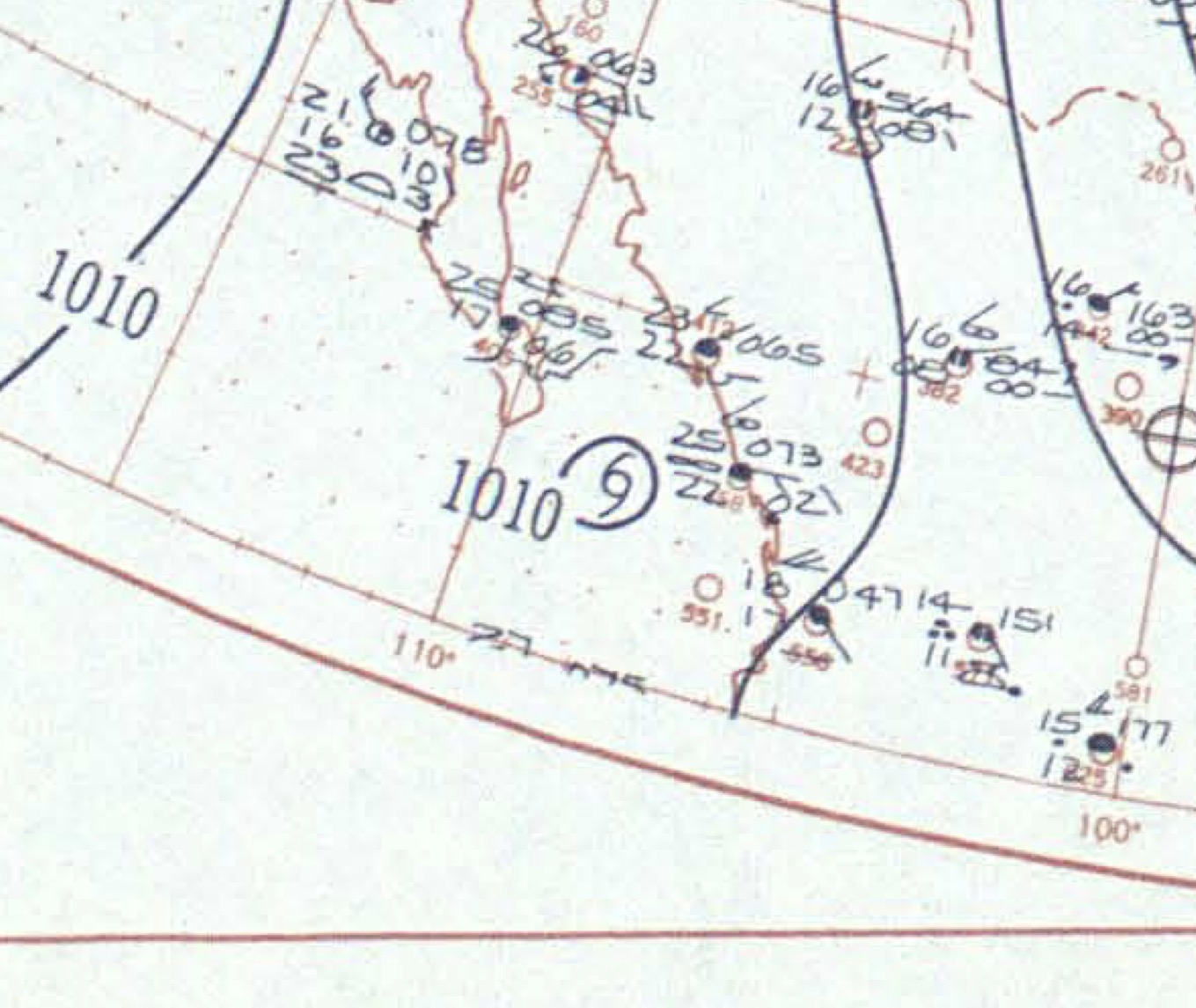
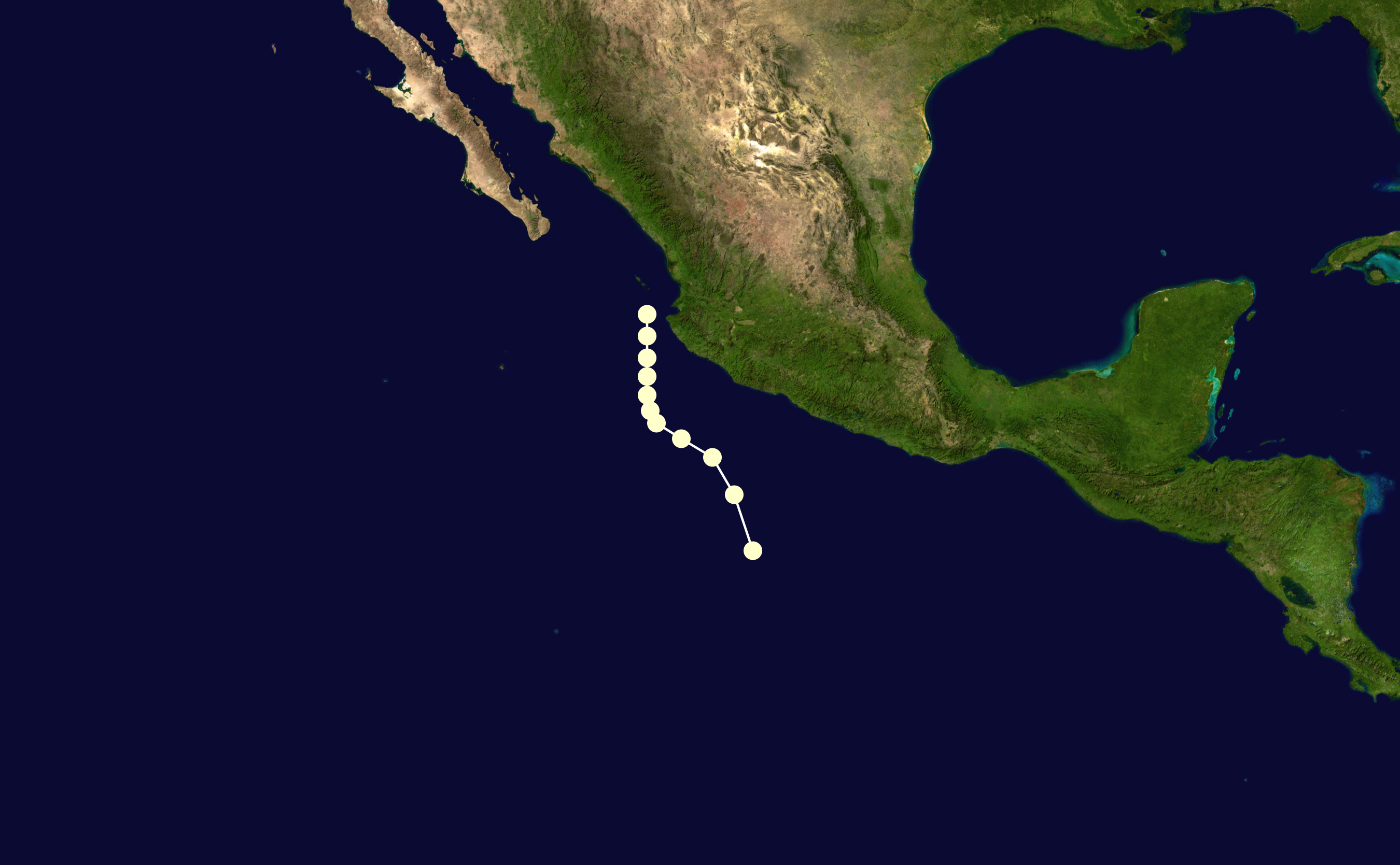
- Duration: October 17 – October 20
- Peak intensity: 85 mph (140 km/h) (1-min); 986 mbar (hPa)

The season's eleven known storm identified several hundred miles south of Mexico on October 17. Quickly tracking northwestward, the storm attained an intensity of 85 mph (135 km/h) during its existence. Early on October 19, the hurricane turned due north, brushing the coastline of Mexico before dissipating just offshore the following day.

=== Hurricane Twelve ===
- Category 4 hurricane (SSHWS)
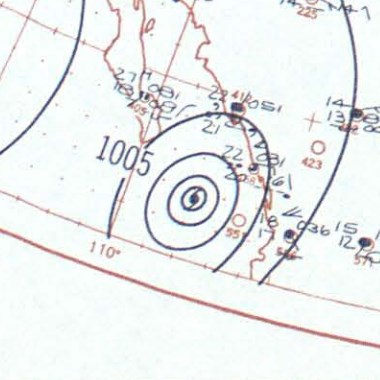
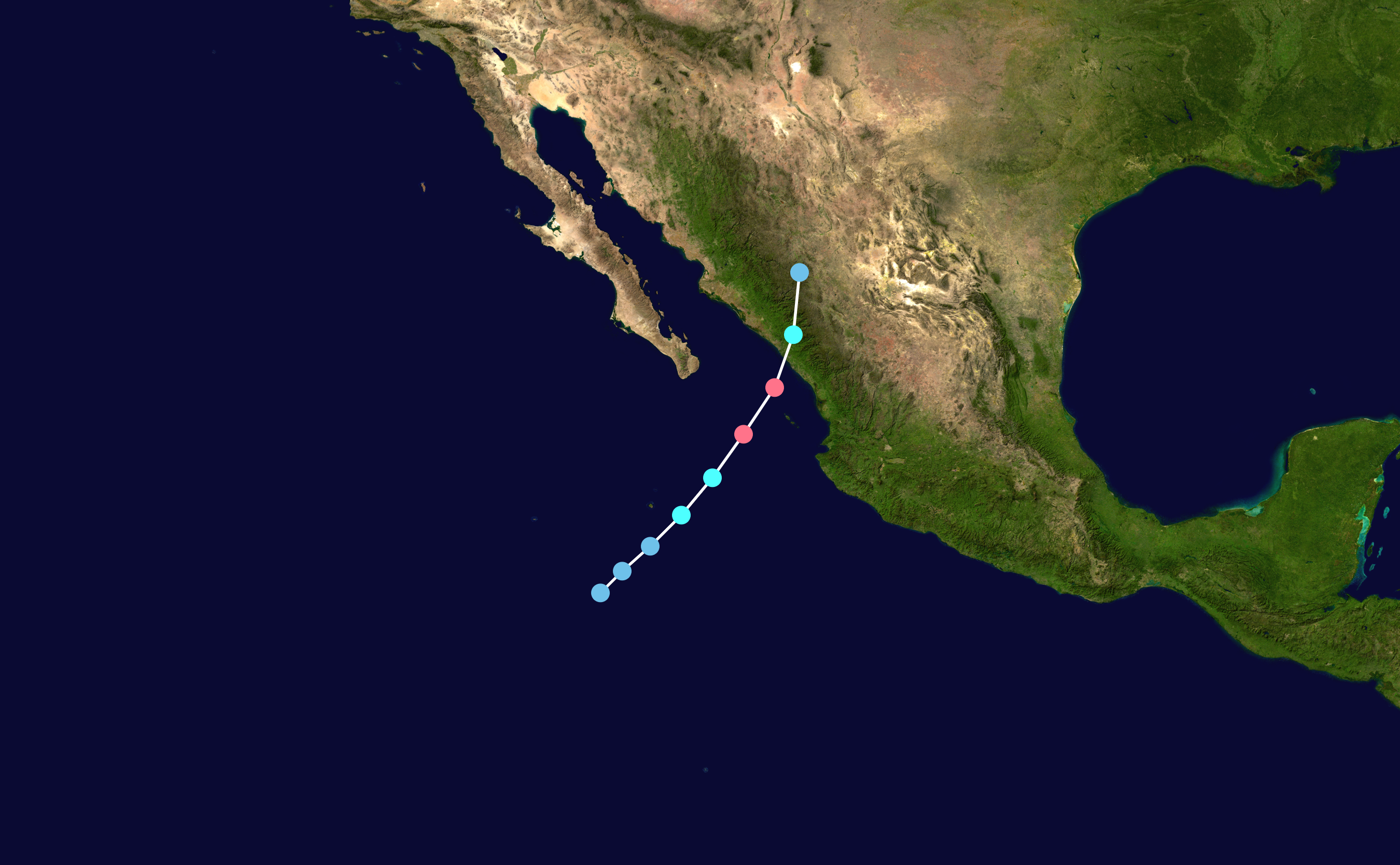
- Duration: October 20 – October 22
- Peak intensity: 140 mph (220 km/h) (1-min); 959 mbar (hPa)

The strongest storm of the season, Hurricane Twelve, was first identified as a tropical depression several hundred miles southwest of Sonora, Mexico on October 20. Tracking northeastward, the system gradually intensified into a tropical storm. Late on October 21, the storm underwent a brief period of explosive intensification, strengthening from a 50 mph (80 km/h) tropical storm to a 140 mph (225 km/h) Category 4 hurricane in roughly six hours. The hurricane maintained this intensity for a further six hours before making landfall near Mazatlán. Rapid weakening took place as the hurricane moved inland, with the system dissipating during the afternoon of October 22.

Throughout the affected region, eight people were killed by the storm. Extensive property damage was reported in the region, including the complete collapse of the local baseball stadium. Power lines and telegraph wires were downed throughout the region and high winds reportedly tossed vehicles into buildings. Many shrimp trawlers sank in the storm, leaving substantial losses in Mexico's shrimping industry. Damage was estimated at US$8 million.

=== Hurricane Nina ===
- Category 1 hurricane (SSHWS)
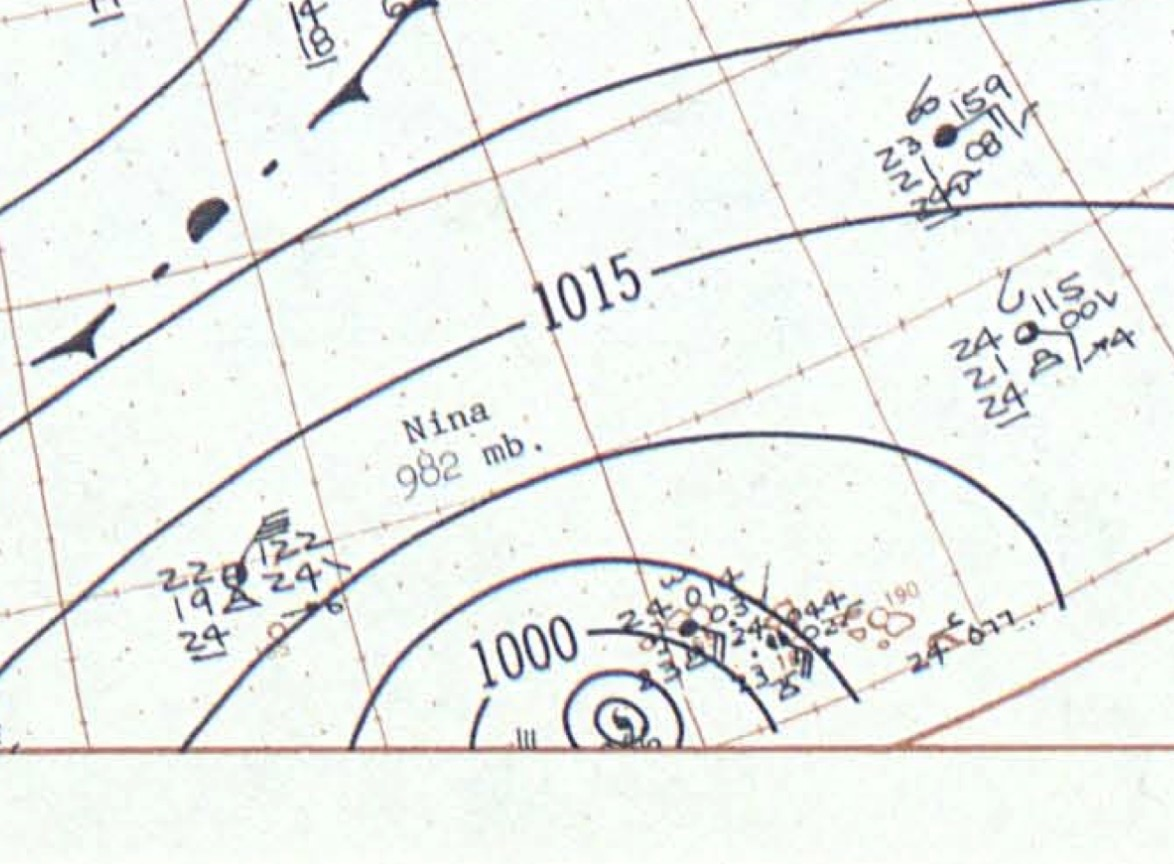
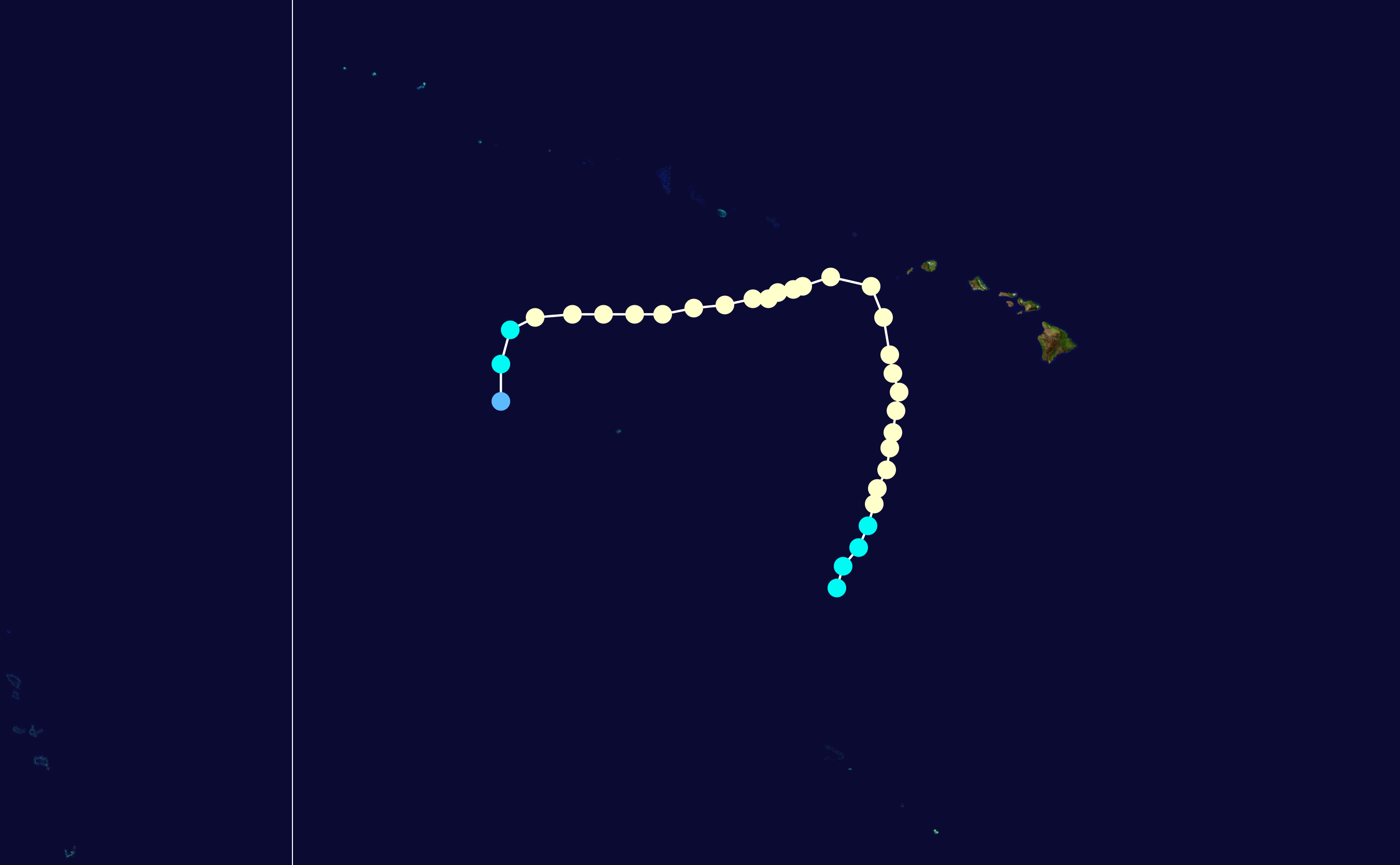
- Duration: November 29 – December 6
- Peak intensity: 85 mph (140 km/h) (1-min); ≤1002 mbar (hPa)

The last storm of the 1957 season, Hurricane Nina, was an unusually late-forming system. It was first identified on November 29 as a tropical storm to the southwest of Hawaii. Steadily tracking north-northeast, the storm intensified into a Category 1 hurricane, by which time it was given the name Nina. As it approached Hawaii, the National Weather Bureau issued warnings for the storm, advising residents to take precaution and possibly evacuate. However, the storm turned westward before moving over the Hawaiian Islands with winds of 85 mph (135 km/h). Gradual weakening took place as the storm continued to move over open waters. Nina eventually dissipated after turning south on December 6.

Waves up to 35 ft (11 m) damaged up to 50 homes across Hawaii and roughly 12 of them being destroyed on Kauai alone. One person was killed on land after being electrocuted by a downed power line. Offshore, a sampan called the Setsu Maru sent a distress call reporting that the boat was sinking 10 miles east of Niihau. All three people aboard the boat were reported dead as a result. In all, damage from the hurricane was estimated at $100,000.

== Storm names ==
During 1957, tropical storms that formed in the Eastern Pacific region, east of 140°W, were not given names by the local warning center. Those that formed in the Central Pacific, between the International Dateline and 140°W, were named by the National Weather Bureau in Honolulu, Hawaii, as follows: Kanoa, a Hawaiian name; Della and Nina, from the Western Pacific typhoon naming list. No names were retired from either region following the season.

== Season effects ==
This is a table of all of the storms that formed in the 1957 Pacific hurricane season. It includes their name, duration, peak classification and intensities, areas affected, damage, and death totals. Deaths in parentheses are additional and indirect (an example of an indirect death would be a traffic accident), but were still related to that storm. Damage and deaths include totals while the storm was extratropical, a wave, or a low, and all of the damage figures are in 1957 USD.

Name	Dates active	Peak classification	Peak 1-minute sustained winds	Land areas affected	Damage (USD)	Deaths	Refs
Kanoa	July 15–26	Category 1 hurricane	85 mph (135 km/h)	None	None	None	
Two	August 6–16	Category 2 hurricane	105 mph (170 km/h)	None	None	None	
Three	August 9–16	Category 1 hurricane	85 mph (135 km/h)	None	None	None	
Della	September 1–9	Category 1 hurricane	85 mph (135 km/h)	Hawaii	None	None	
Five	September 9–11	Tropical storm	50 mph (80 km/h)	None	None	None	
Six	September 17–18	Category 1 hurricane	85 mph (135 km/h)	Mexico	Unknown	7	
Seven	September 20–23	Tropical storm	50 mph (80 km/h)	None	None	None	
Eight	September 25–28	Tropical storm	50 mph (80 km/h)	None	None	None	
Nine	September 26–27	Tropical storm	50 mph (80 km/h)	None	None	None	
Ten	October 1–6	Category 1 hurricane	85 mph (135 km/h)	Mexico		2	
Eleven	October 17–20	Category 1 hurricane	85 mph (135 km/h)	None	None	None	
Twelve	October 20–22	Category 4 hurricane	140 mph (225 km/h)	Mexico	Unknown	8	
Nina	November 29 – December 6	Category 1 hurricane	85 mph (135 km/h)	Mexico	$100,000	4	
Season Aggregates
13 storms	July 15 – December 6		140 mph (225 km/h)		$100,000	21	

== See also ==
- Pacific hurricane season
- 1957 Atlantic hurricane season
- 1957 Pacific typhoon season
- Australian region cyclone seasons: 1956–57 1957–58
- South Pacific cyclone seasons: 1956–57 1957–58
- South-West Indian Ocean cyclone seasons: 1956–57 1957–58
