= Schooner Bayou Control Structure =

Flood control structure in Vermilion Parish, Louisiana, U.S.

Coordinates: 29.758123°N 92.264038°W

The Schooner Bayou Control Structure is a flood control structure located in Vermilion Parish, Louisiana, and operated by the U.S. Army Corps of Engineers. It is part of the Mississippi Valley Division, New Orleans District, which encompasses the southern half of the state of Louisiana.

== General information ==
Schooner Bayou Control Structure, circa 1994.

It is located in the enlarged White Lake to Vermilion Bay channel opposite the abandoned Schooner Bayou Lock and approximately five miles southwest of Intracoastal City. The structure is accessible only by boat.

The structure is a feature of the Mermentau River and Tributaries, Louisiana, project, authorized by the Flood Control Act of 18 August 1941, as modified by the Rivers and Harbors Act of 24 July 1946.

The purpose of the structure is to aid in preventing saltwater intrusion into the Mermentau River Basin where it would interfere with irrigation of rice lands. It also aids in the prompt and efficient release of floodwaters that may occur within the basin. The structure is operated in conjunction with Calcasieu and Leland Bowman Locks on the Gulf Intracoastal Waterway (GIWW), Catfish Point Control Structure on the Mermentau River, and Freshwater Bayou Lock on the south side of the basin, all of which help prevent salt water intrusion into the Mermentau River Basin.

Schooner Bayou Control Structure looking east. The delineation between freshwater (foreground) and saltwater (background) can be clearly seen.

The structure was constructed under contract with Keller Construction Corporation. Work was started on August 8, 1949, and was completed on May 22, 1951, at a cost of $672,829.18. There were no known problems encountered during construction on either contract.

The Schooner Bayou Control Structure consists of two 75-foot-wide (23 m) reinforced concrete gatebays, side-by-side, each equipped with a pair of 60-degree steel sector gates. The sill elevation of both gatebays is -12.0 with sidewalls extending to elevation 6.0. The gate structures are joined at the center of the channel and offset to each other so that adjacent gate recesses overlap. Timber guidewalls are provided on both approaches to the gatebays. The structure is protected from flanking flow by earth dikes constructed on both sides of the structure. The old Schooner Bayou Lock was closed by a dike, and a new channel was provided from White Lake through the new Schooner Bayou Control Structure to the GIWW.

During high water the gates will be opened to permit passage of any vessel that can navigate against the current which can attain velocities of up to 15 knots. Vessels coming from East or West can bypass the floodgates by going through North Prong-Schooner Bayou into the Intracoastal Waterway SE of Forked Island at Mile Marker 167.

== Hydrologic data ==
Hydrologic data is collected daily consisting of pool levels, salinity readings, tide readings, water temperature, rainfall, etc., and is posted onto public websites.

== Hurricane Rita ==
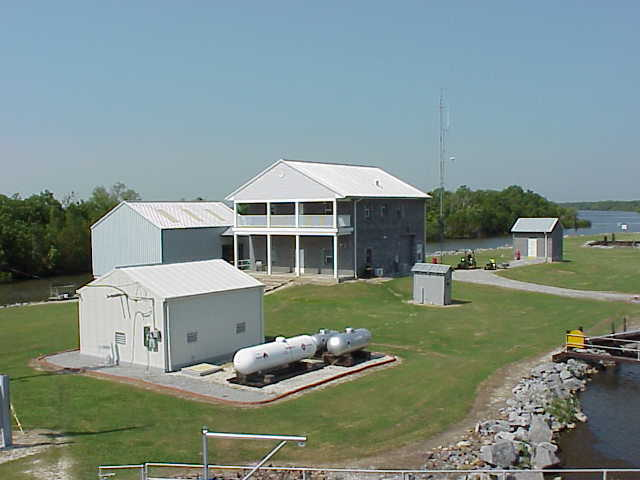
Office with generator building in foreground, circa 2000

Hurricane Rita made landfall between Sabine Pass, Texas, and Johnson Bayou, Louisiana, at 02:38 CDT (07:38 UTC) on September 24, 2005, as a category 3 Hurricane with winds at 115 mph. Winds in Eastern Vermilion Parish were at strong tropical force/ weak hurricane force causing minimal wind damage to Schooner Bayou Control Structure. But the resulting storm surge later that morning rose to a level of 10.5 feet above Mean Low Gulf (MLG), overtopping the concrete structure by 4.5 feet. Saltwater damage to the structure machinery and electrical system occurred, requiring extensive repairs. The structure was returned to operational status in approximately 30 days. The main office building, which sits 9 feet above MLG, required remodeling in the entire first floor after receiving 1.5 feet of water inside the building.

Employees returning to the site the morning after landfall found that the water level had already dropped to 6.5 feet above MLG as the surge waters flowed back out to sea. The gates were opened using hand cranks and backup generators to allow the flood waters to drain. The remainder of the flood waters required approximately 2 months to drain from White Lake and the Mermentau River Basin.

== See also ==
- Gulf Intracoastal Waterway
