= List of storms named Agnes =

The name Agnes has been used for a total of seventeen tropical cyclones worldwide: thirteen in the Western Pacific Ocean, and one each in the Atlantic Ocean, the South-West Indian Ocean, and the South Pacific Ocean. It has also beed used for one extratropical cyclone in Europe.

In the Atlantic:

- Hurricane Agnes (1972), a Category 1 hurricane that formed over the Yucatán Peninsula and became the costliest natural disaster in the United States on record at the time.

The name Agnes was retired from the Atlantic tropical system naming lists by the U.S. Weather Bureau following the 1972 hurricane season.

In the Western Pacific:

- Typhoon Agnes (1948) (T4834), a Category 2 typhoon that struck Japan
- Typhoon Agnes (1952) (T5220), a Category 5 super typhoon that did not approach land
- Typhoon Agnes (1957) (T5707), a Category 4 super typhoon that passed over the Ryūkyū Islands at peak strength before making landfall in South Korea as a tropical storm
- Tropical Storm Agnes (1960) (T6013, 29W), a tropical storm that passed over Taiwan in August
- Typhoon Agnes (1963) (T6308, 18W, Ising), struck northern Luzon in the Philippines as a Category 2 typhoon before entering the South China Sea where it made a second landfall in China
- Tropical Storm Agnes (1965) (T6527, 33W), a tropical storm that formed in the South China Sea and made landfall in Guangdong, China
- Typhoon Agnes (1968) (T6813, 17W), a Category 5 super typhoon that did not approach land
- Typhoon Agnes (1971) (T7127, 29W, Warling), a Category 1 typhoon that struck Taiwan, causing severe flooding in Taipei
- Typhoon Agnes (1974) (T7422, 26W), a Category 3 typhoon that stayed well clear of land
- Tropical Storm Agnes (1978) (T7809, 09W), a tropical storm in the South China Sea that performed a cyclonic loop before hitting China
- Typhoon Agnes (1981) (T8118, 18W, Pining), a Category 2 typhoon that caused severe flooding in South Korea
- Typhoon Agnes (1984) (T8424, 27W, Undang), reached Category 4 strength before passing through the Philippines and making a second landfall in Vietnam, causing at least 1,000 fatalities
- Tropical Storm Agnes (1988) (T8807, 07W), a tropical storm in late July that formed near Iwo Jima

In the South-West Indian:

- Tropical Storm Agnes (1971), made landfall in northern Madagascar

In the South Pacific:

- Cyclone Agnes (1995), a Category 3 cyclone south of Port Moresby in the Coral Sea that did not approach land

In Europe:

- Storm Agnes (2023), an extratropical cyclone that impacted Ireland and the United Kingdom

== See also ==
- Cyclone Agni (2004) – a similarly-named storm in the North Indian Ocean
