= 1957 Pacific typhoon season =

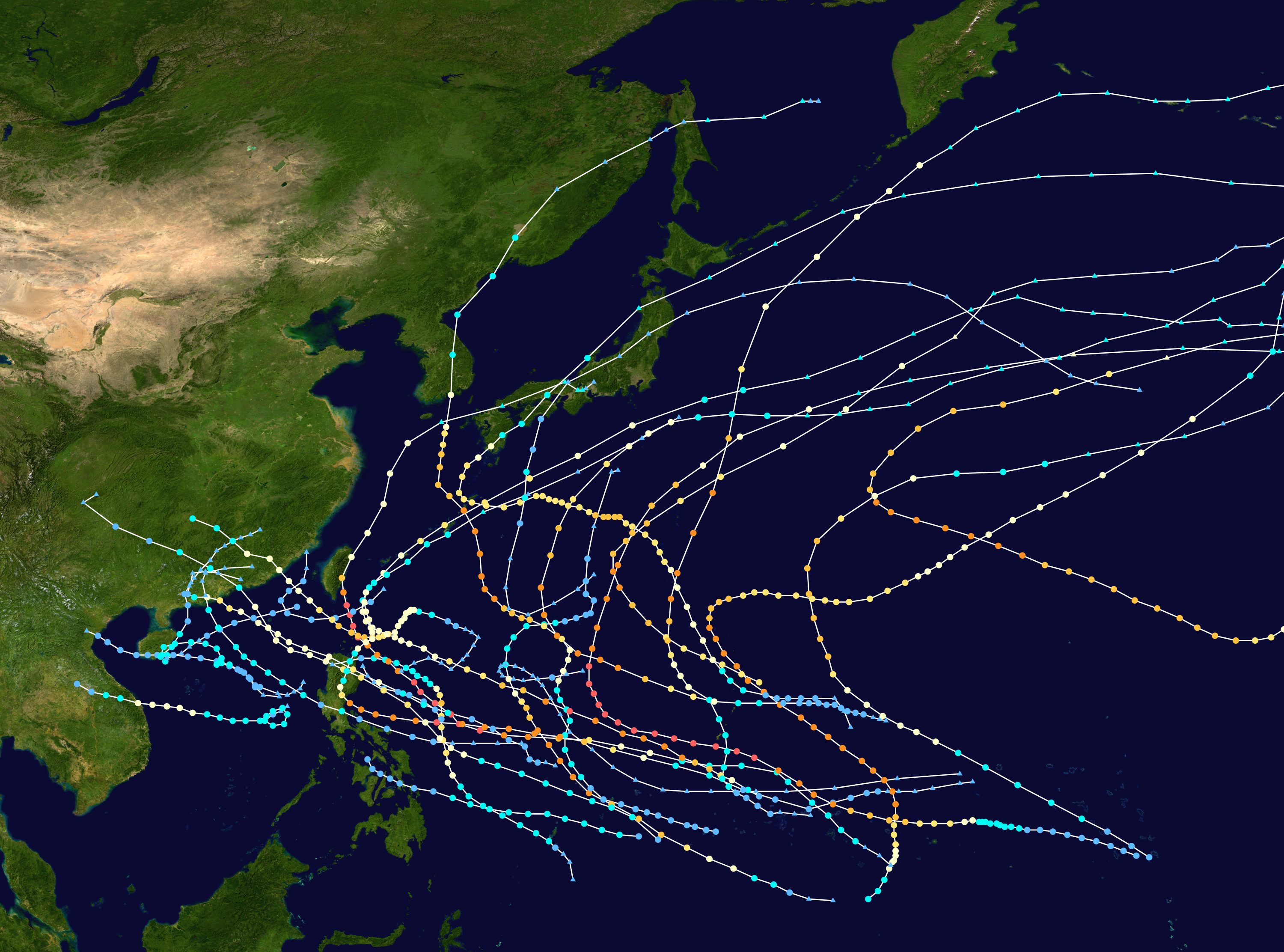
- Season summary map

Seasonal boundaries
- First system formed: January 3, 1957
- Last system dissipated: November 23, 1957

Strongest storm
- Name: Lola
  - Maximum winds: 295 km/h (185 mph) (1-minute sustained)
  - Lowest pressure: 900 hPa (mbar)

Seasonal statistics
- Total depressions: 27
- Total storms: 22
- Typhoons: 18
- Very strong typhoons: 8 (unofficial)
- Total fatalities: 644
- Total damage: Unknown

Related articles
- 1957 Atlantic hurricane season; 1957 Pacific hurricane season; 1950s North Indian Ocean cyclone seasons

The 1957 Pacific typhoon season has no official bounds; it ran year-round in 1957, but most tropical cyclones tend to form in the northwestern Pacific Ocean between June and December. These dates conventionally delimit the period of each year when most tropical cyclones form in the northwestern Pacific Ocean.

The scope of this article is limited to the Pacific Ocean, north of the equator and west of the International Date Line. Storms that form east of the date line and north of the equator are called hurricanes; see 1957 Pacific hurricane season. Tropical storms formed in the entire west Pacific basin were assigned a name by the Fleet Weather Center on Guam.

== Seasonal summary ==
Most intense Pacific typhoon seasons
Rank	Seasons	ACE value
1	1997	570.4
2	2004	480.6
3	1992	470.1
4	2015	462.9
5	1994	454.6
6	1958	445.8
7	1957	440.2
8	1965	436.2
9	1962	423
10	1996	416.5

The accumulated cyclone energy (ACE) index for the 1957 Pacific typhoon season as calculated by Colorado State University using data from the Joint Typhoon Warning Center was 440.2 units, which is the seventh highest ACE for a single season ever recorded. Twenty-two tropical storms developed in 1957 in the Northwestern Pacific. Tropical depressions were likely, but no records are known to exist that would mention any. Eighteen storms reached typhoon intensity, of which 8 reached super typhoon strength. An additional storm, Della, came across the Dateline from the Central Pacific, therefore it is not taken account in the total number of storms.

== Systems ==
=== Tropical Storm 01W ===
- Tropical storm (JMA)
- Tropical storm (SSHWS)
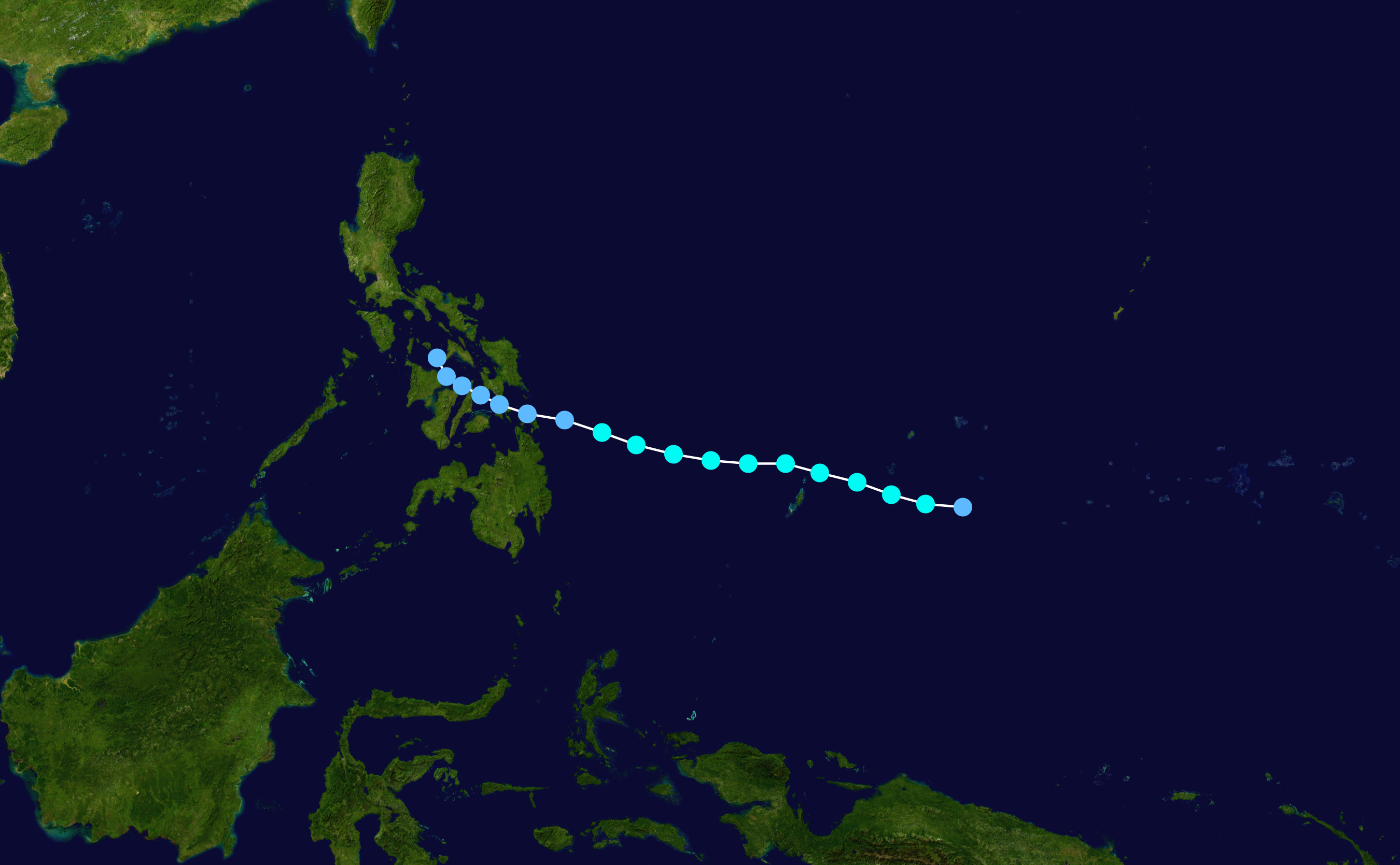
- Duration: January 3 – January 7
- Peak intensity: 75 km/h (45 mph) (1-min); 995 hPa (mbar)

The first tropical cyclone of the 1957 season, classified as Tropical Storm 01W by the JTWC, was initially identified early on January 3 as a tropical depression over open waters east of the Philippines. Within several hours, the system intensified into a tropical storm as it tracked west-northwestward. Later that day, the storm attained its peak intensity with winds of 45 mph (72 km/h) and a barometric pressure of 995 millibars (29.4 inHg). Tropical Storm 01W maintained this intensity through January 5 before abruptly weakening to a tropical depression near the eastern Philippines. The system made landfall in eastern Leyte early on January 6 with winds of 35 mph (56 km/h) before dissipating the following day over Romblon.

=== Super Typhoon Rose ===
- Typhoon (JMA)
- Category 4 super typhoon (SSHWS)
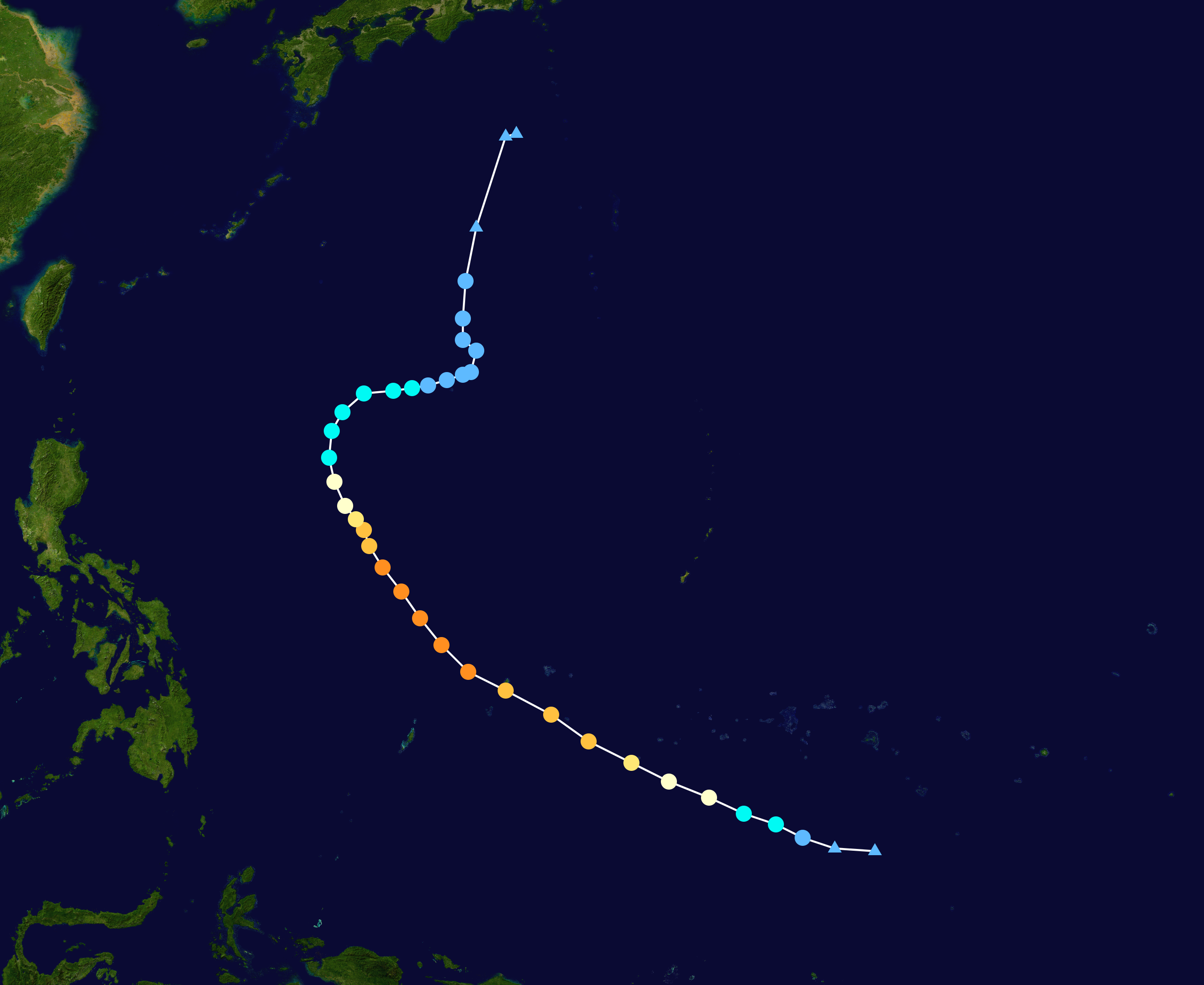
- Duration: January 21 – January 30
- Peak intensity: 250 km/h (155 mph) (1-min); 920 hPa (mbar)

About two weeks after Tropical Storm 01W dissipated over the Philippines, a new tropical depression formed to the southeast of Guam on January 21. Gradual intensification took place as the depression tracked westward. The JTWC began monitoring the system as Tropical Storm Rose the following day, with the first advisory on the storm placing maximum winds at 50 mph (80 km/h). Rose maintained this intensity for roughly 24 hours before undergoing a brief period of rapid intensification, attaining winds of 110 mph (180 km/h) early on January 23. For most of the day, the now Category 2 typhoon, strengthened at a more modest rate before undergoing a second brief period of rapid intensification. At the end of the second strengthening phase, Rose had attained its peak intensity just at Category 5 status, on the modern-day Saffir–Simpson Hurricane Scale, with winds of 160 mph (260 km/h), and a minimum pressure of 920 millibars (27 inHg). Upon attaining this intensity, Rose became the most intense January typhoon on record, surpassing that of Super Typhoon Karen in 1948.

After attaining its peak intensity, Rose began to take a more northerly track and weakened. Late on January 25, Rose rapidly weakened to a low-end typhoon and by January 26, the system had further weakened to a tropical storm. The JTWC continued to monitor the weakening tropical storm until January 27, by which time Rose had maximum winds of 40 mph (64 km/h). However, the JMA continued monitoring the remnants of Rose as it turned sharply eastward over open waters. During the afternoon of January 28, the depression nearly stalled as it turned northward before accelerating and losing its identity south of Japan on January 30.

=== Typhoon Shirley ===
- Typhoon (JMA)
- Category 3 typhoon (SSHWS)
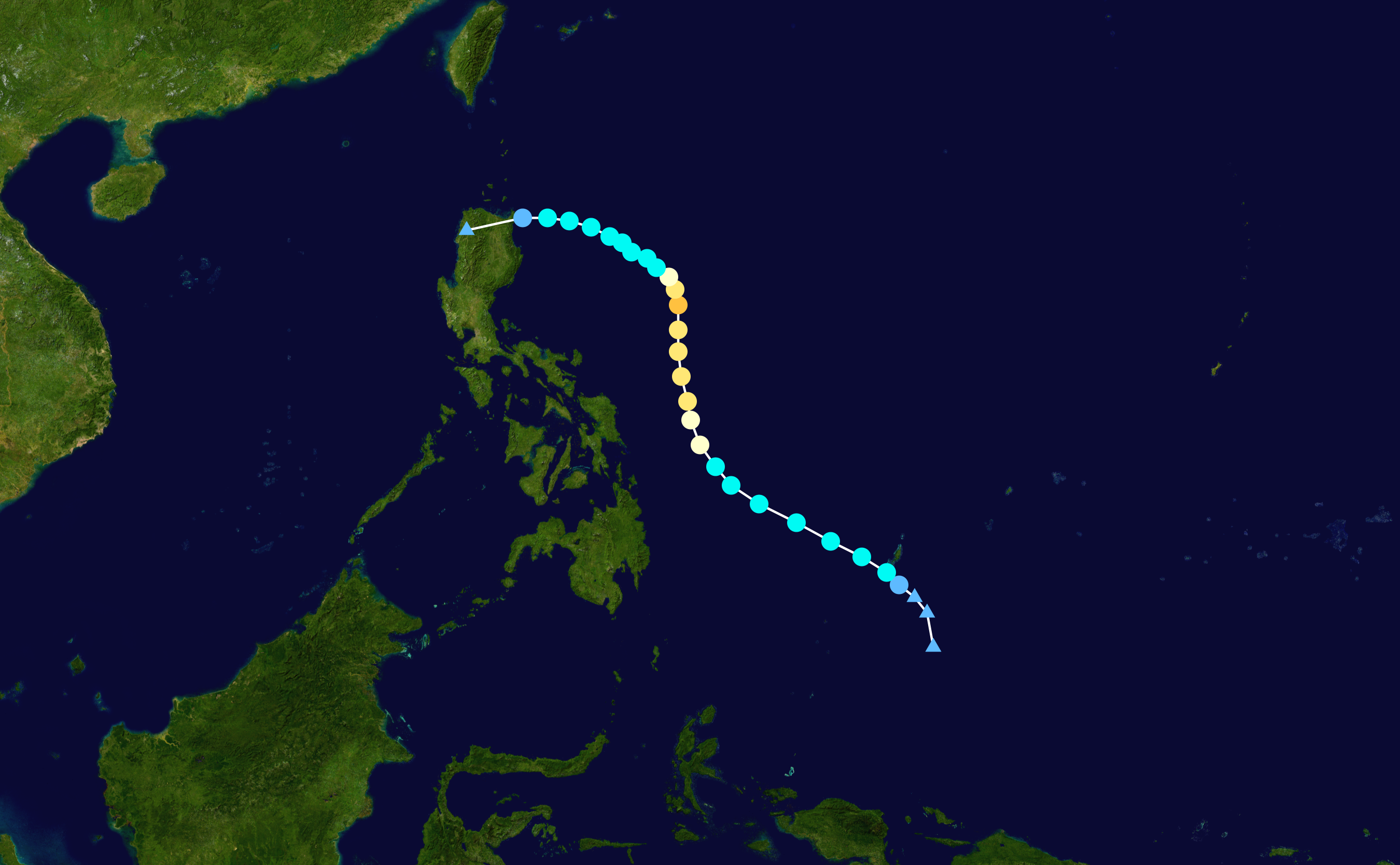
- Duration: April 11 – April 18
- Peak intensity: 185 km/h (115 mph) (1-min); 975 hPa (mbar)

Shirley formed on April 11 east of the Philippines. It moved north and intensified to its brief peak of 115 mph (185 km/h) winds and a pressure of 975 mbar on April 15. Shirley then turned to the northwest and weakened to a tropical storm on April 16. Shirley turned to the west and dissipated on April 18 near the northern end of Luzon.

=== Typhoon Trix ===
- Typhoon (JMA)
- Category 4 typhoon (SSHWS)
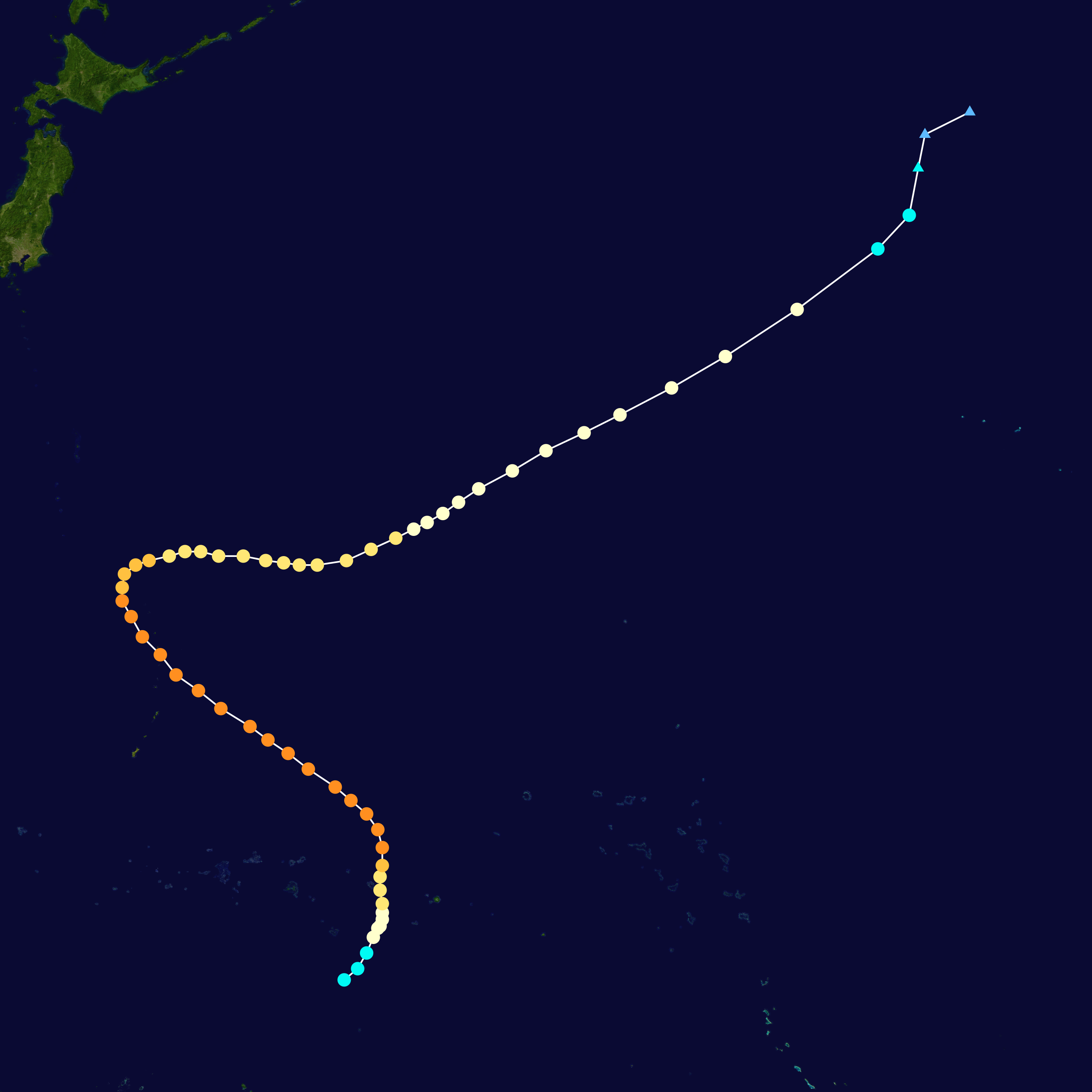
- Duration: May 2 – May 16
- Peak intensity: 220 km/h (140 mph) (1-min); 950 hPa (mbar)

Trix formed on May 2 near the Marshall Islands. It moved north briefly on May 3 and May 4, intensified to its peak of 140 mph (230 km/h) on May 5, and then turned to the west-northwest. Trix turned to the north on May 9 and to the east-northeast on May 10, weakening to a Category 2 typhoon on May 11. Trix continued to move northeast and weakened to a Category 1 typhoon on May 13. It dissipated on May 17 just over the Date Line without affecting any land.

=== Super Typhoon Virginia ===
- Typhoon (JMA)
- Category 5 super typhoon (SSHWS)
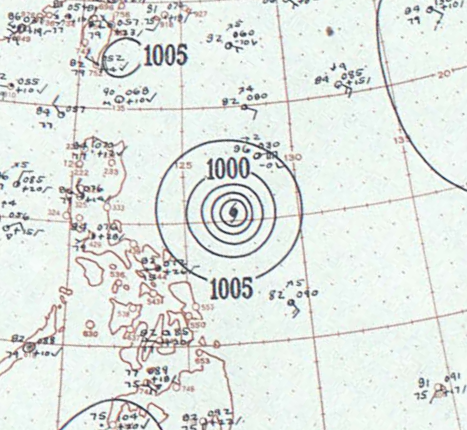
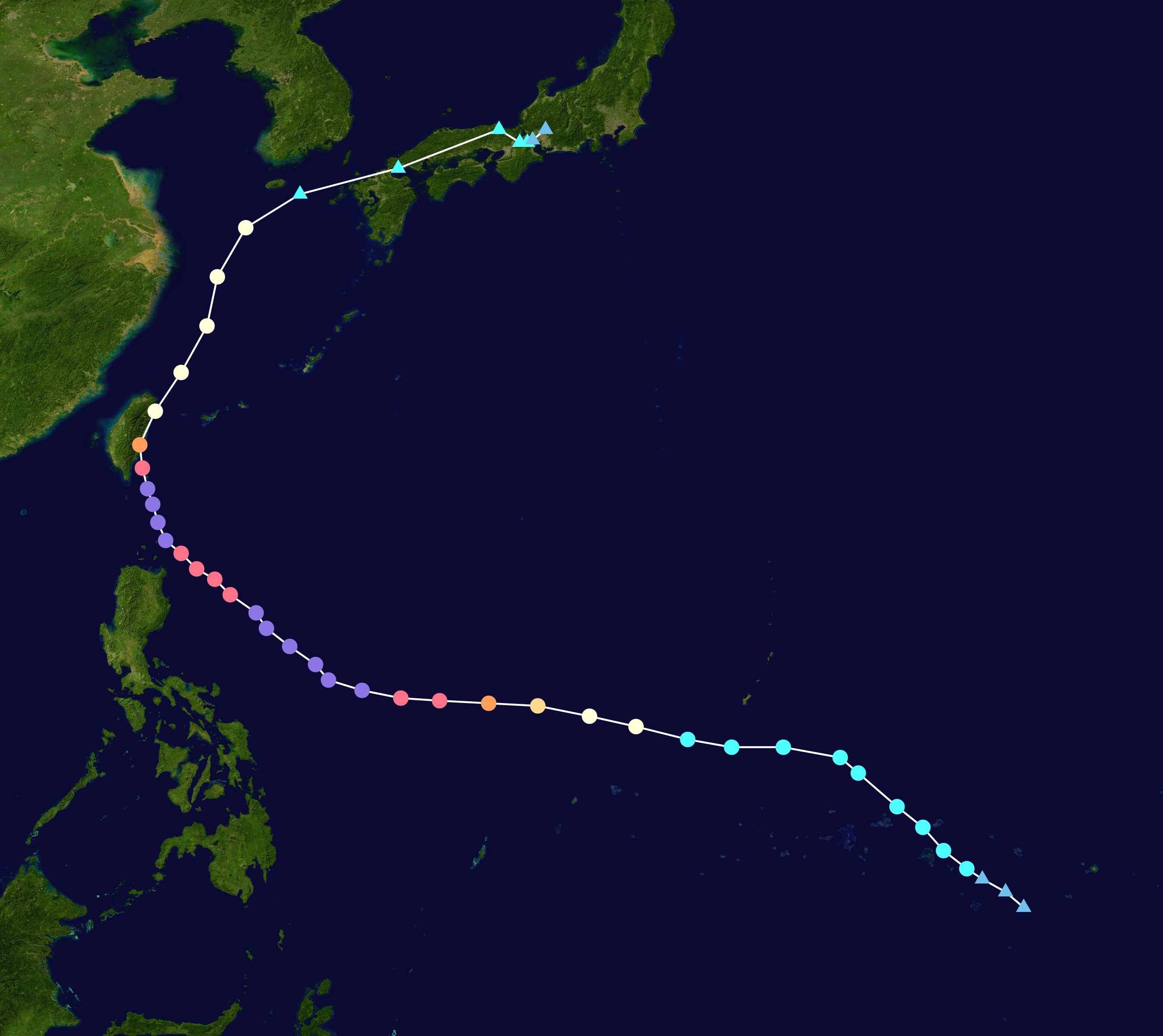
- Duration: June 18 – June 26
- Peak intensity: 280 km/h (175 mph) (1-min); 900 hPa (mbar)

Virginia formed on June 18 in the open western Pacific east of the southern Philippines. It moved west and strengthened to a typhoon on June 20 and reached its peak of 175 mph (282 km/h) and a minimum central pressure of 900 mbar on June 22. Virginia then began to move northwest and weakened to a Category 4 typhoon as it passed east of Luzon on June 23 and June 24. It turned northward on June 24, strengthened to a secondary peak of 160 mph (260 km/h), and weakened before it made landfall in Taiwan on June 25 as a Category 2 typhoon. Virginia then continued to move north and then northeast until its dissipation on June 28.

Virginia was an early season typhoon. It destroyed 1,000 buildings and killed 86 people as it sliced through Taiwan and southern Japan. The storm left $20 million (1957 USD) in damage.

=== Typhoon Wendy ===
- Typhoon (JMA)
- Category 2 typhoon (SSHWS)
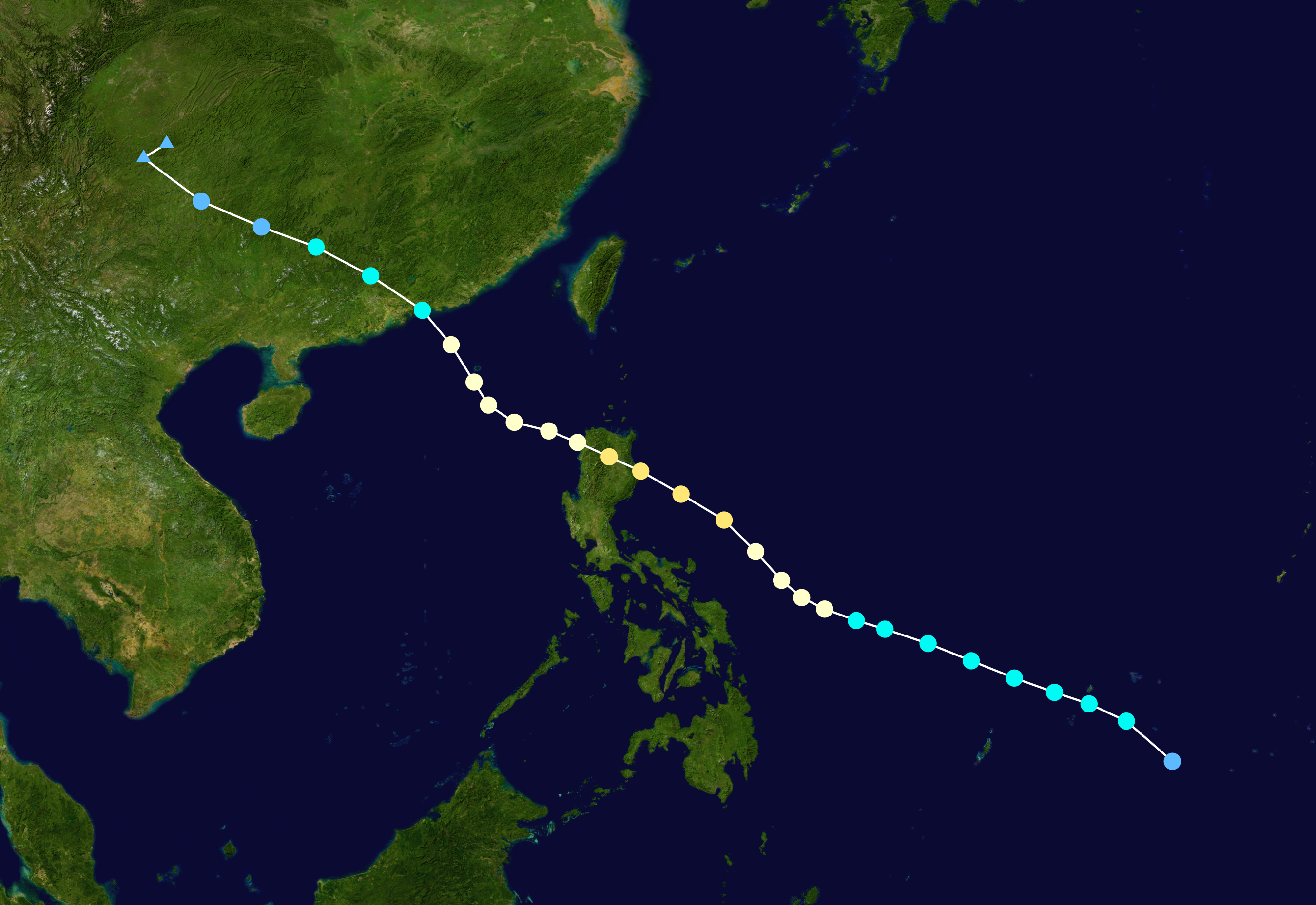
- Duration: July 10 – July 18
- Peak intensity: 165 km/h (105 mph) (1-min); 985 hPa (mbar)

According to the International Best Track Archive for Climate Stewardship, Wendy originated from a tropical depression well east of the Philippines on July 10. Developing into a tropical storm several hours later, further development would occur as Wendy tracked northwestwards. As a result, around three days later, the system became a typhoon. Further intensification occurred, and around 15:00 UTC on July 14, Wendy peaked with sustained winds of 90 knots (100 mph) and a minimum pressure of 985 hPa. However, around that time, Wendy made its first landfall in Luzon, causing it to weaken into a Category 1-equivalent typhoon the next day. Although it temporarily reintensified, attaining a secondary peak with sustained winds of 80 knots (90 mph) around that time, it began rapidly weakening, making its final landfall in Guangdong, China as a high-end tropical storm. Once inland, Wendy rapidly weakened, dissipating on July 16.

Prior to striking the nation, the Hong Kong Observatory hoisted a No. 5 storm signal as Wendy was expected to strike the nation. This was later upgraded to a No. 6 storm signal when Wendy made its closest approach to Hong Kong. Two cruisers from the Royal Navy left the colony. Due to the typhoon's winds, American billionaire Nelson Rockefeller had to divert his plane to the colony. Despite these preparations, Wendy's impacts in Hong Kong were severe. Striking the island with gusts of 95 knots (110 mph) and torrential rainfall, the typhoon killed sixteen and injured a further two hundred. These included two boys who were killed when their huts collapsed on them and another boy who was also killed when he drowned in the sea surrounding West Point. The roof and rear of four homes collapsed, blocking all of Stavely Street. The SS Tweed Breeze broke from its buoy and ran aground in Stonecutter's Island, while parts of Taipo Road became inaccessible due to collapsing. Elsewhere, in the Philippines, Wendy brought flooding which killed at least seventy-six, most of them children, and made a further three hundred go missing. This flooding also displaced around thirty thousand people and destroyed several towns. Damage there amounted to $2 million (1957 USD). Elsewhere, in China's Guangdong Province, over three hundred-thousand people were mobilized to gather crops and take safety precautions due to the storm. Offshore Guangdong Province, eight people died when their fishing boat sank due to Wendy. Additionally, estimates indicated that around a fifth of the unharvested rice in the province was destroyed. Although Wendy did bring some gale-force winds to Taiwan, no damage was reported there.

=== Super Typhoon Agnes ===
- Typhoon (JMA)
- Category 4 super typhoon (SSHWS)
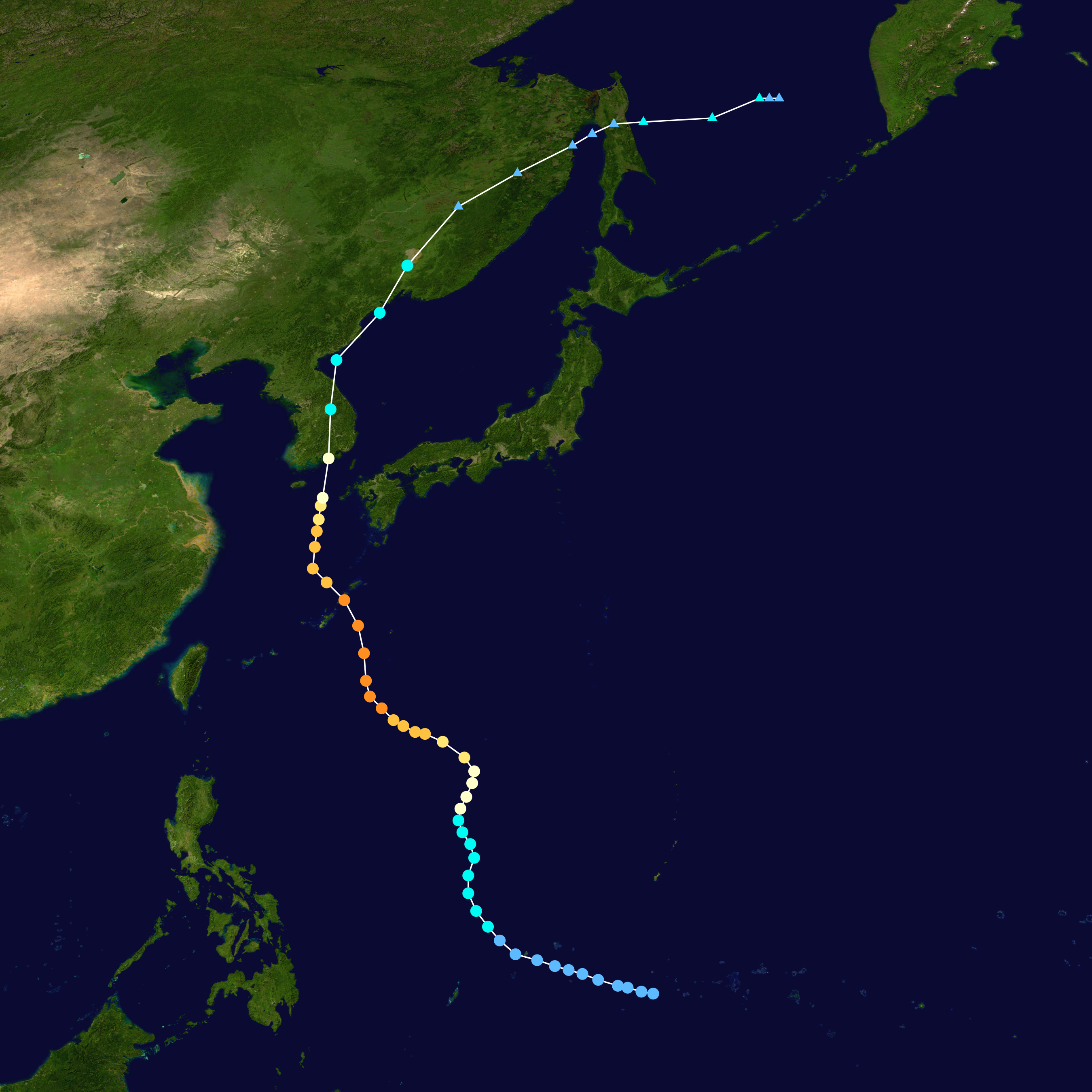
- Duration: August 11 – August 22
- Peak intensity: 250 km/h (155 mph) (1-min); 905 hPa (mbar)

On August 12, the seventh storm of the season formed. Agnes moved in an erratic northern direction until August 16, when it briefly turned to the northwest toward China. Agnes then began to curve towards the north, passing over one of the Ryukyu Islands with 155 mph winds and a minimum central pressure of 905 mbar. After it passed over the islands, Agnes weakened to tropical storm strength. On August 21, South Korea was struck by a 50 mph Agnes; their 1st tropical cyclone of the season. It passed over the peninsula and briefly was over water before it hit Russia with 45 mph winds. Agnes became extratropical the next day over southern Russia. Its extratropical form continued for two more days until it dissipated in the center of the Sea of Okhotsk.

=== Tropical Storm 08W ===
- Tropical storm (JMA)
- Tropical storm (SSHWS)
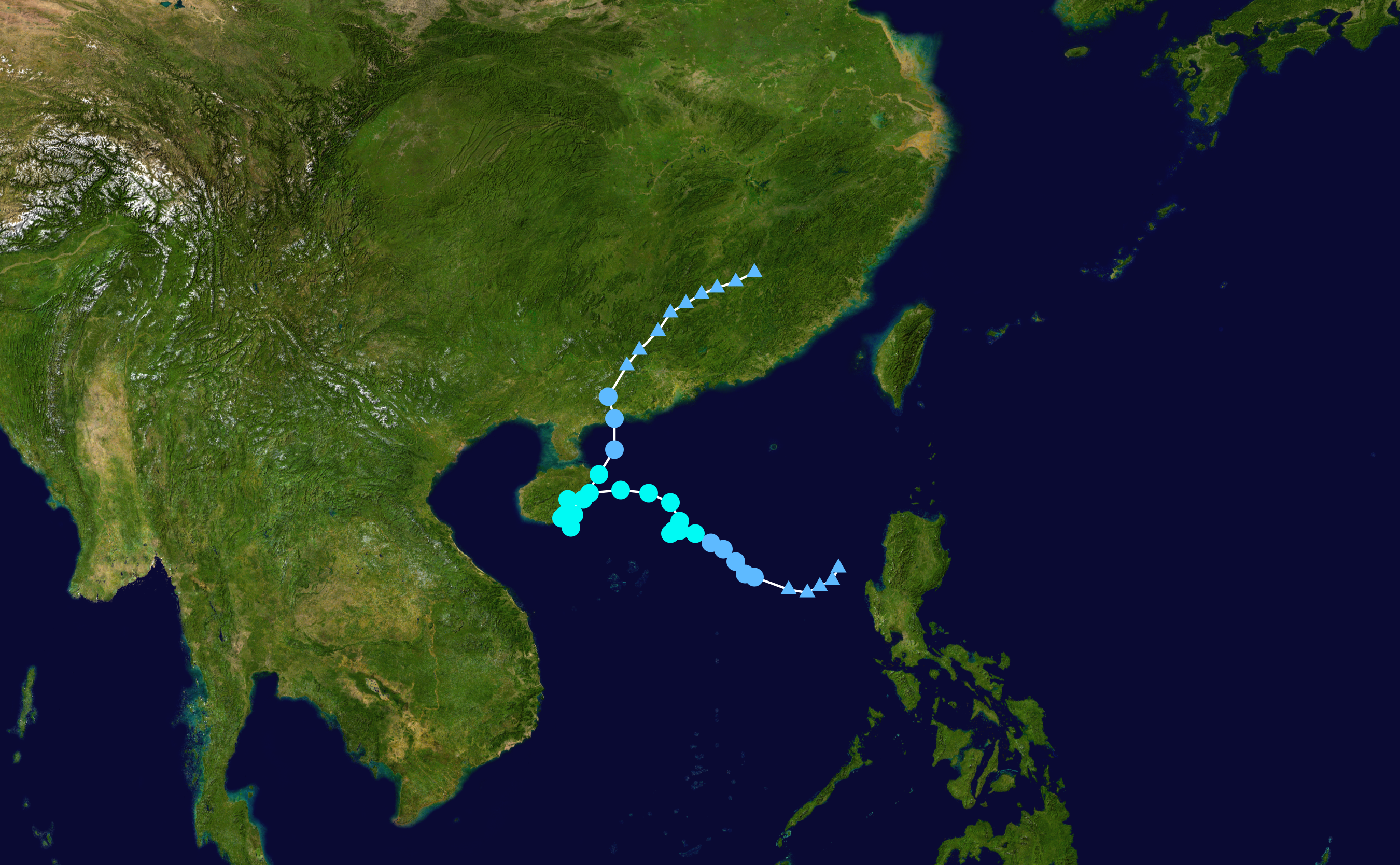
- Duration: August 13 – August 20
- Peak intensity: 100 km/h (65 mph) (1-min); 984 hPa (mbar)

08W formed on August 15, becoming the 8th of the season. It moved in a generally westward direction for a couple days until it struck Hainan on August 18 with 65 mph winds and a minimum pressure of 984 mbar. It moved south over land, retaining its strength. It soon moved north again, but suddenly turned southwest for a brief time before it returned to its original path. It weakened to a tropical depression on August 20 and struck mainland China later that day. It almost became extratropical almost at the same time. Ex-08W lingered northeast until the 24th, when the last of it was gone after ten days in existence.

=== JMA Tropical Storm Nine ===
- Tropical storm (JMA)
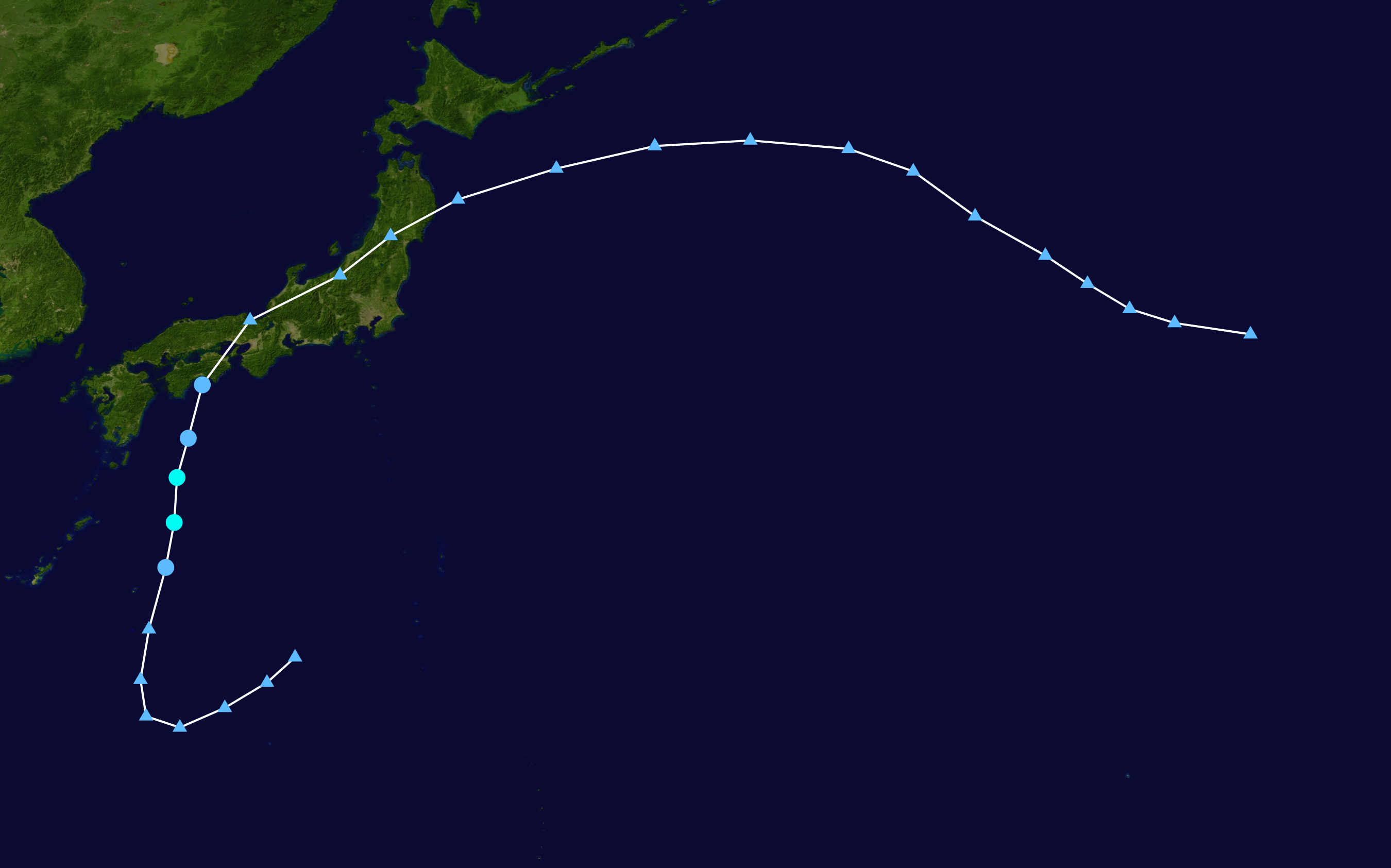
- Duration: August 22 – August 24
- Peak intensity: 75 km/h (45 mph) (10-min); 998 hPa (mbar)

A disturbance close to Japan's coast developed into a tropical depression on August 22, and became a tropical storm 6 hours later. It managed to achieve a minimum central pressure of 999 mbar before it struck the southeastern portion of Japan. It weakened to a tropical depression shortly before landfall though, and became extratropical the next day. But its extratropical remnants continued to move north-northeast, then northeast, and then east-northeast until it dissipated on August 27.

=== Typhoon Bess ===
- Typhoon (JMA)
- Category 3 typhoon (SSHWS)
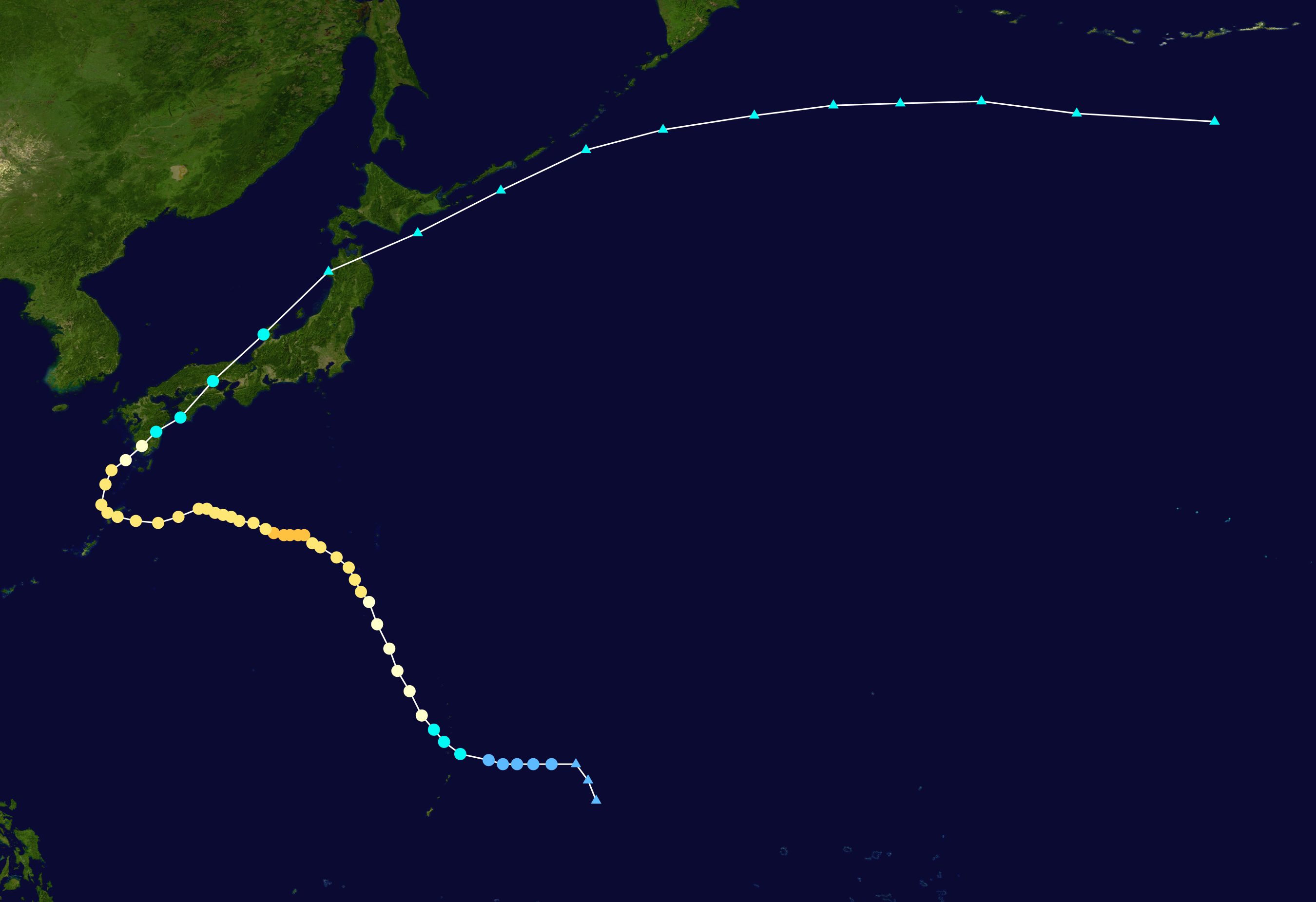
- Duration: August 26 – September 7
- Peak intensity: 185 km/h (115 mph) (1-min); 950 hPa (mbar)

Bess formed on August 26 close to the Marshall Islands. After moving westward, Bess attained Category 3 status with 115 mph winds a pressure of 950 mbar. It hit southern Japan on September 6 and later became extratropical over water on September 9. But the extratropical form of Bess continued east for one more day before it became disorganized enough to be declared dissipated.

On August 30, the typhoon battered the United States military base on Iwo Jima with winds of 110 mph (180 km/h), resulting in communication loss for roughly 23 hours. After communication was restored, officials on the island stated that there was likely no loss of life as a result of the storm. Little damage also took place throughout Iwo Jima.

Widespread damage took place throughout Kyushu as wind gusts up to 115 mph (185 km/h) and torrential rains impacted the region. Along coastal regions, waves exceeding 13 ft (4.0 m) caused significant coastal damage. In Kyushu, at least six people were killed, 14 others listed as missing and 28 more injured as a result of Bess. According to police reports, 912 homes were destroyed and 1,522 others were severely damaged by flooding and landslides triggered by Typhoon Bess. An additional 2,510 homes sustained minor damage. Throughout Japan, an estimated 24,000 people were left homeless in the wake of the storm. In all, at least 20 people were killed as a result of Bess in Japan.

=== Typhoon Carmen ===
- Typhoon (JMA)
- Category 3 typhoon (SSHWS)
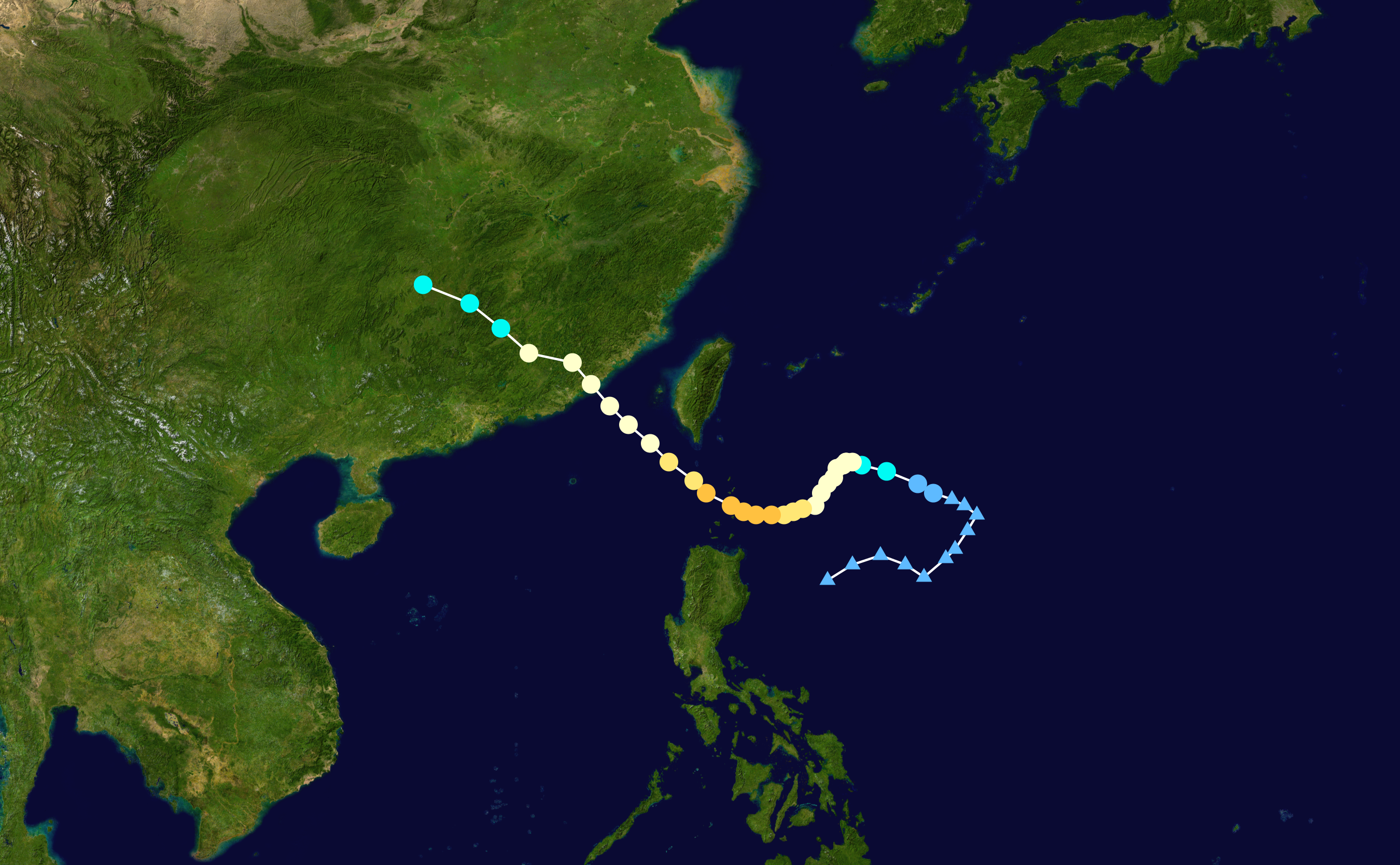
- Duration: September 6 – September 16
- Peak intensity: 205 km/h (125 mph) (1-min); 960 hPa (mbar)

Carmen formed on September 9 north-northeast of the Philippines. It slowly moved north and the west over the course of three days, until it strengthened to a tropical storm. Carmen headed south briefly before heading east-northeast, when it began to strengthen even more. Carmen reached winds of 125 mph and a pressure of 960 mbar. But shortly thereafter, the strengthening stopped, and it slowly weakened. On September 15, Carmen made landfall in southern China and dissipated the following day.

=== Typhoon Della ===
- Typhoon (JMA)
- Category 4 typhoon (SSHWS)
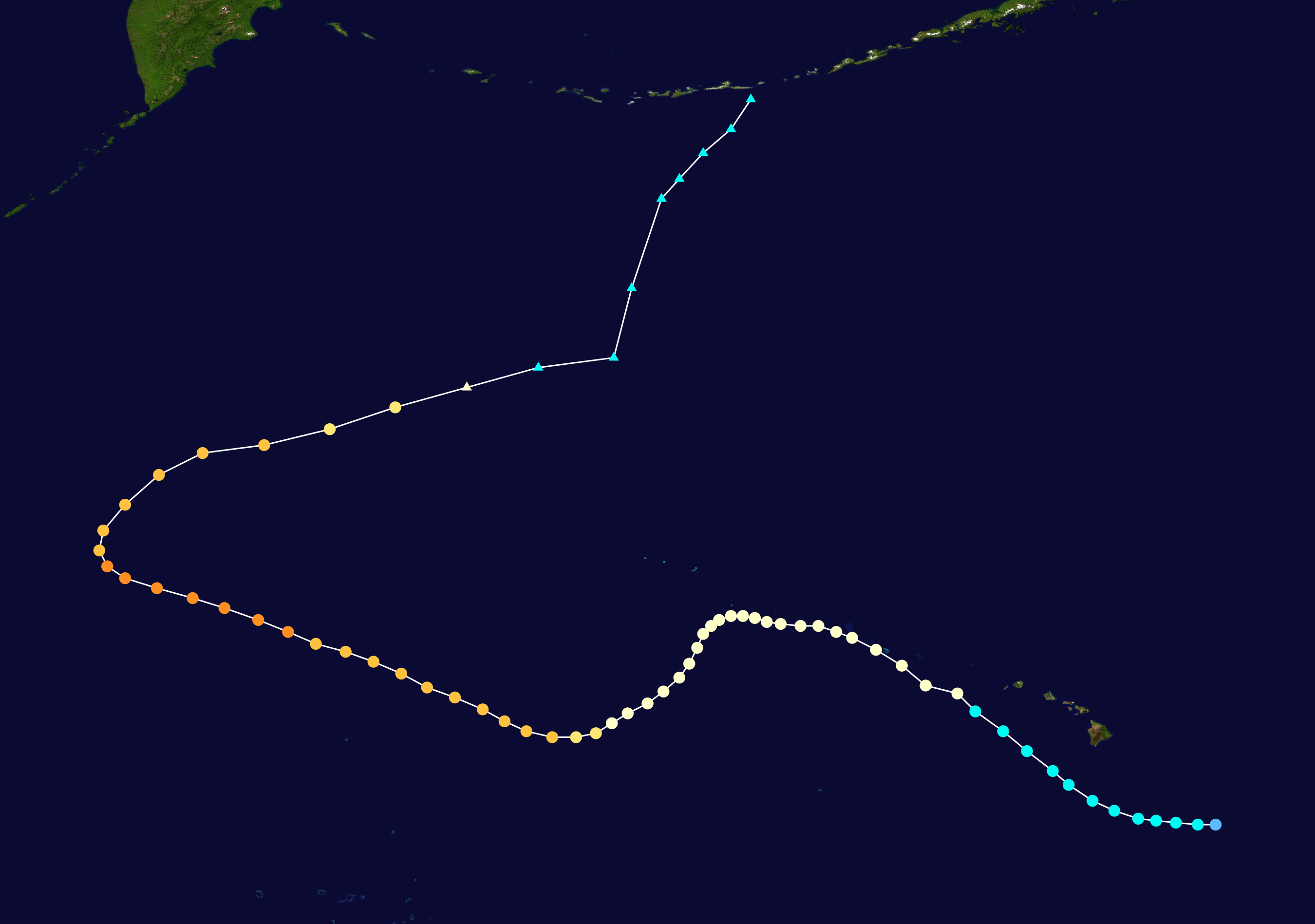
- Duration: September 9 (Entered basin) – September 17
- Peak intensity: 220 km/h (140 mph) (1-min); 960 hPa (mbar)

A disturbance in the Intertropical Convergence Zone developed into Tropical Storm Della on September 1. Della moved west-northwestward, strengthening to a hurricane while west of Hawaii. There, it brought heavy surf to the western islands. The hurricane continued generally westward, moving to the southwest while crossing the International Date Line. It turned westward and the northwestward. During its long northwestward trek, Della reached its peak intensity of 140 mph and a minimum central pressure of ≤960 mbar. On September 14, Della began to travel a completely opposite direction-northeast. It continued that direction for a number of days, until it reached the Dateline as a 70 mph tropical storm. As the storm was crossing the date line, it turned sharply to the north-northeast. A few days later, Della turned east-northeast and dissipated on September 18.

=== Typhoon Elaine ===
- Typhoon (JMA)
- Category 4 typhoon (SSHWS)
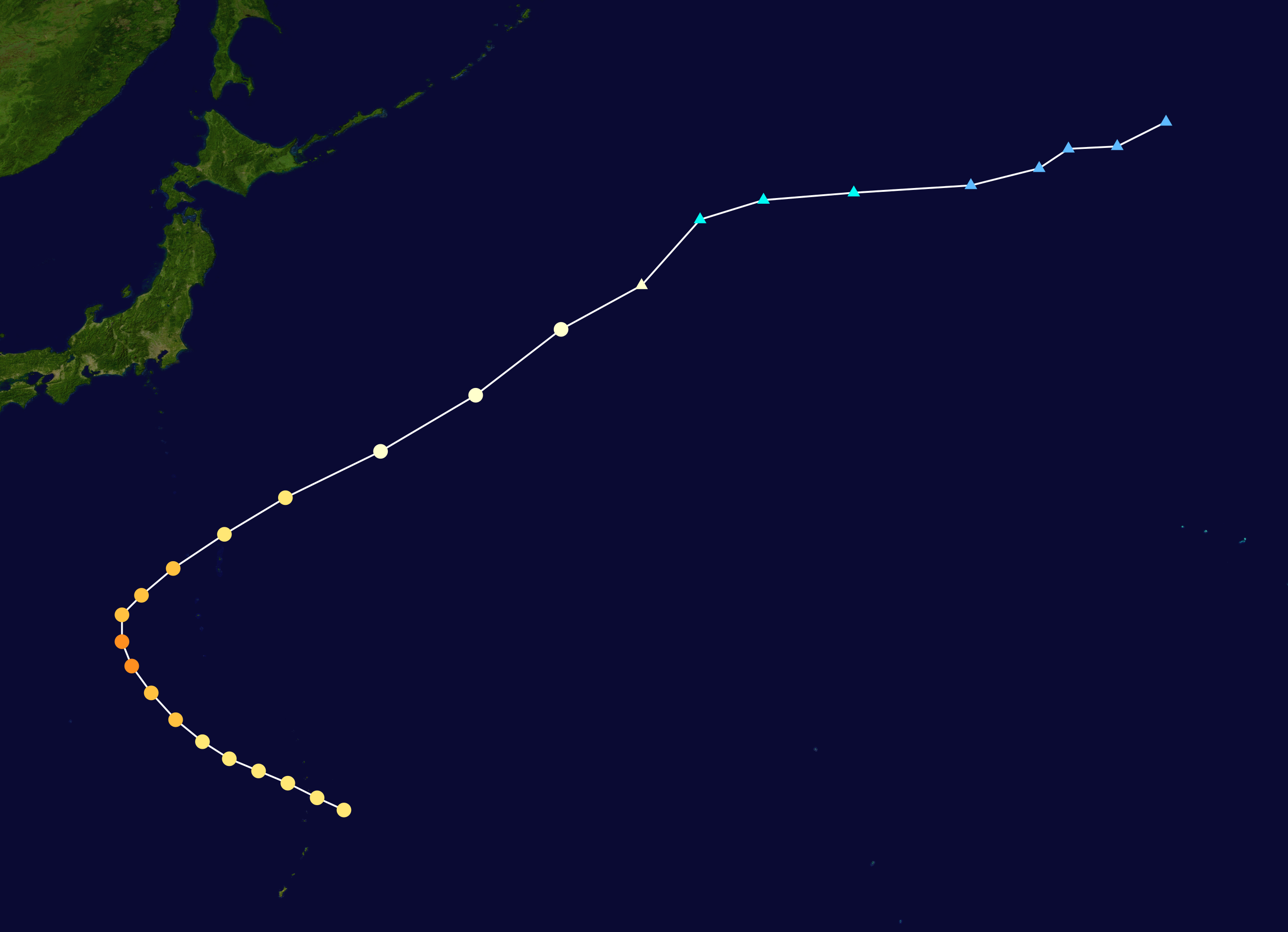
- Duration: September 14 – September 19
- Peak intensity: 220 km/h (140 mph) (1-min); 945 hPa (mbar)

On September 14, in the open Pacific, Elaine was formed. It moved in a generally northwestward direction while gaining strength. Its peak intensity was 140 mph and a pressure of 945 mbar. But it turned sharply to the northeast and lost strength. On its penultimate day as a tropical cyclone, it turned eastward and became extratropical the next day. Elaine's extratropical form continued one more day, and dissipated, one week since its formation, just over the Dateline.

=== Super Typhoon Faye ===
- Typhoon (JMA)
- Category 5 super typhoon (SSHWS)
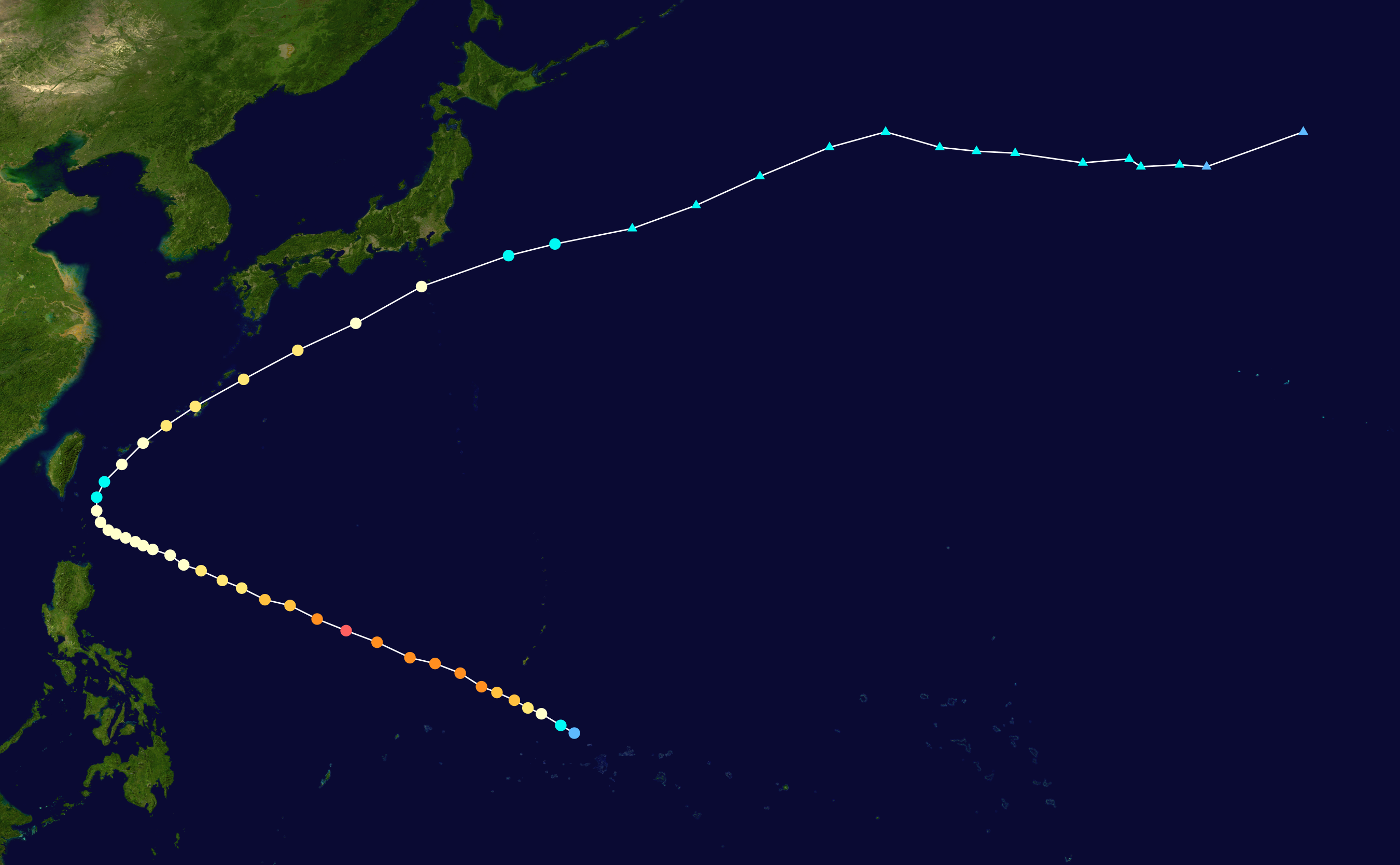
- Duration: September 17 – September 27
- Peak intensity: 260 km/h (160 mph) (1-min); 930 hPa (mbar)

Faye formed on September 18. It strengthened at a moderate pace until it reached its peak of 160 mph (260 km/h) and 930 mbar. After weakening, it struck Okinawa as a Category 2 typhoon; Faye battered the island, which was still recovering from Typhoon Emma that struck the same area a year ago. 53 people died in its wake, while 79 were listed as missing. Faye also left damages, straining the expensive budget caused by past and future typhoons that struck the island. Faye passed over the Date Line and shortly after became extratropical on the last day of the month, but continued one more day as an extratropical system before it met its demise.

=== Typhoon Gloria ===
- Typhoon (JMA)
- Category 2 typhoon (SSHWS)
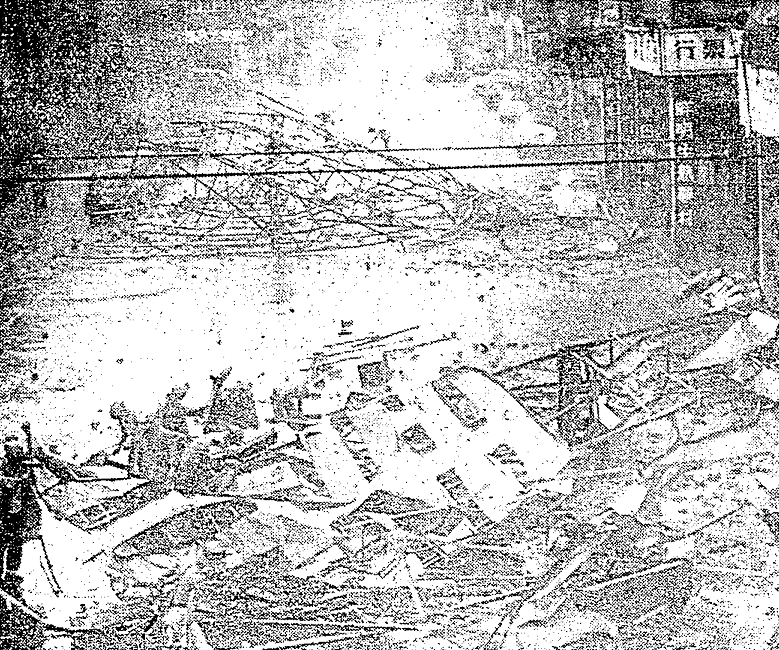
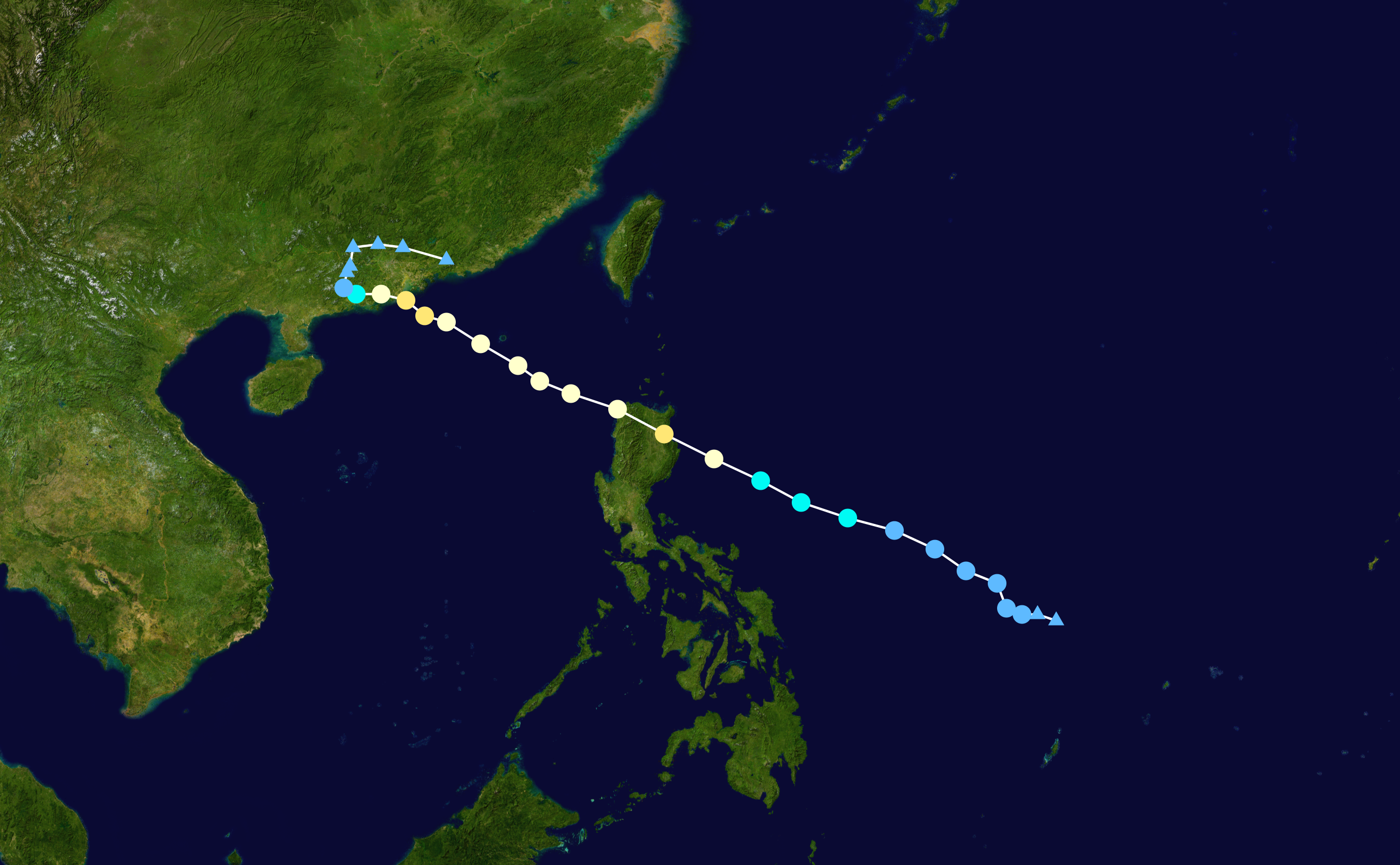
- Duration: September 17 – September 24
- Peak intensity: 165 km/h (105 mph) (1-min); 980 hPa (mbar)

Gloria formed on September 17. After crossing the Philippines as a category two, it brought hurricane winds to Hong Kong and strong winds to Macau. After landfall, it moved east and met its demise on September 24. It had a minimum central pressure of 980 mbar and maximum winds of 105 mph.

=== Super Typhoon Hester ===
- Typhoon (JMA)
- Category 4 super typhoon (SSHWS)
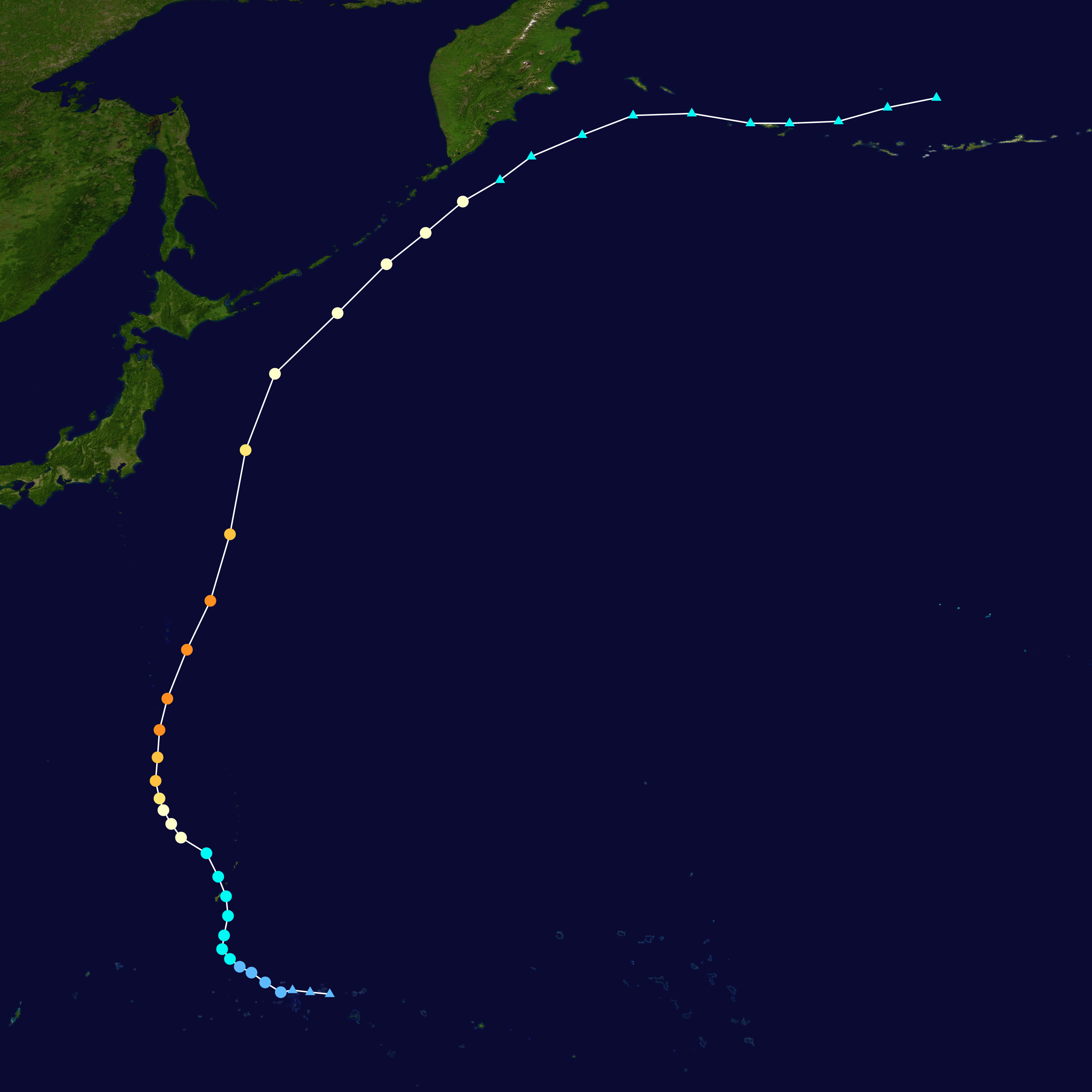
- Duration: October 3 – October 10
- Peak intensity: 240 km/h (150 mph) (1-min); 900 hPa (mbar)

Hester formed on October 3, several hundred miles east of the Philippines. At first, it slowly intensified, then rapid intensification occurred, reaching its peak strength of 150 mph while southeast of Japan. It then gradually weakened, weakening to a tropical storm southeast of the Kamchatka Peninsula. It then further weakened, dissipating just north of the Aleutian Islands.

=== Typhoon Irma ===
- Tropical storm (JMA)
- Category 1 typhoon (SSHWS)
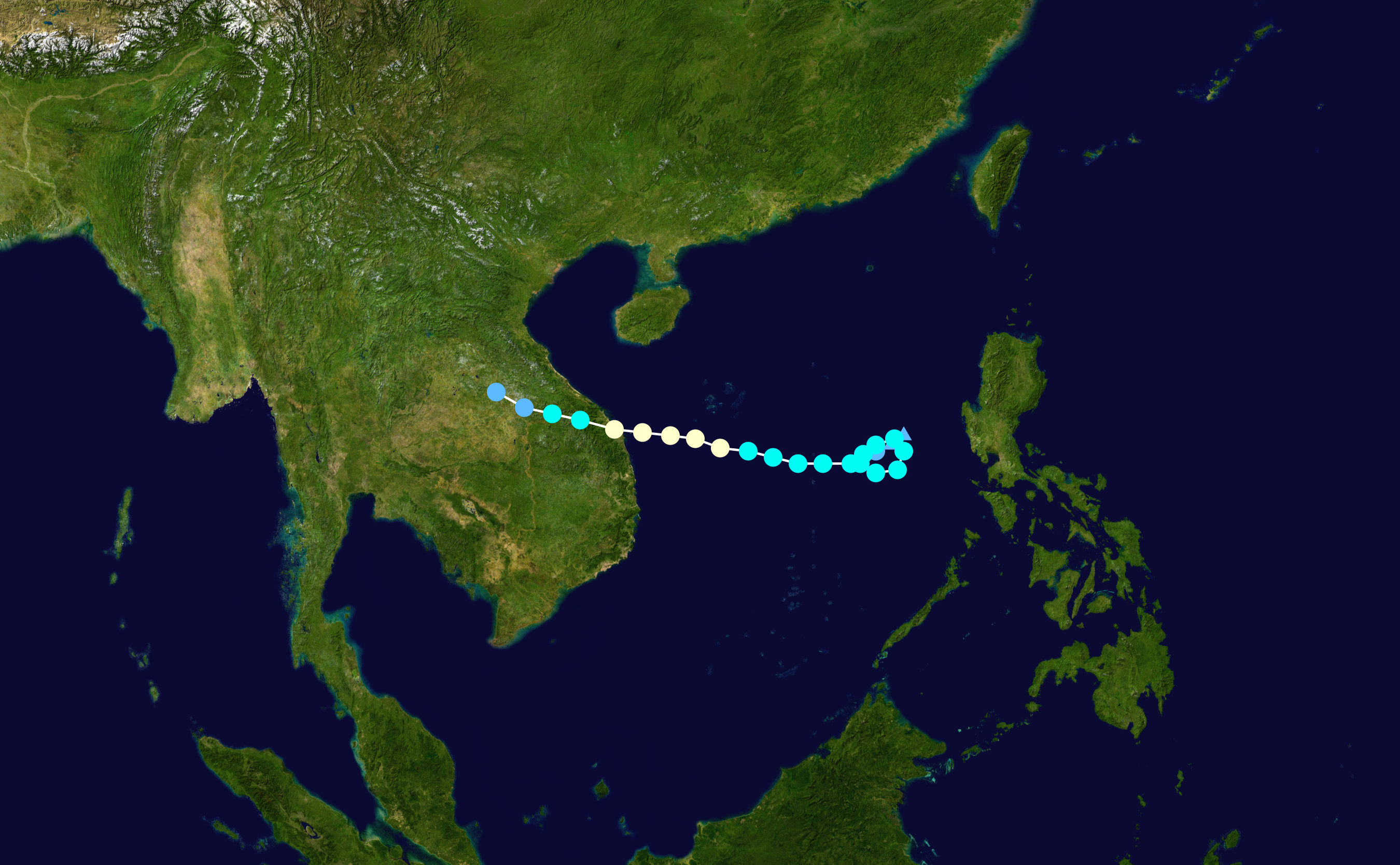
- Duration: October 9 – October 13
- Peak intensity: 140 km/h (85 mph) (1-min); 990 hPa (mbar)

Irma formed on October 9, west of the Philippines. The tropical cyclone strengthened to a category one typhoon with maximum sustained winds of 85 mph and a minimum central pressure 990 mbar. It moved west, and hit Vietnam with 80 mph winds and a minimum central pressure of 995 mbar. It dissipated on October 13, over the Thailand–Laos border.

Typhoon Irma brought torrential rains and high winds to Vietnam, resulting in nine fatalities and an estimated $2 million in damage.

=== Tropical Storm 17W ===
- Tropical storm (JMA)
- Tropical storm (SSHWS)
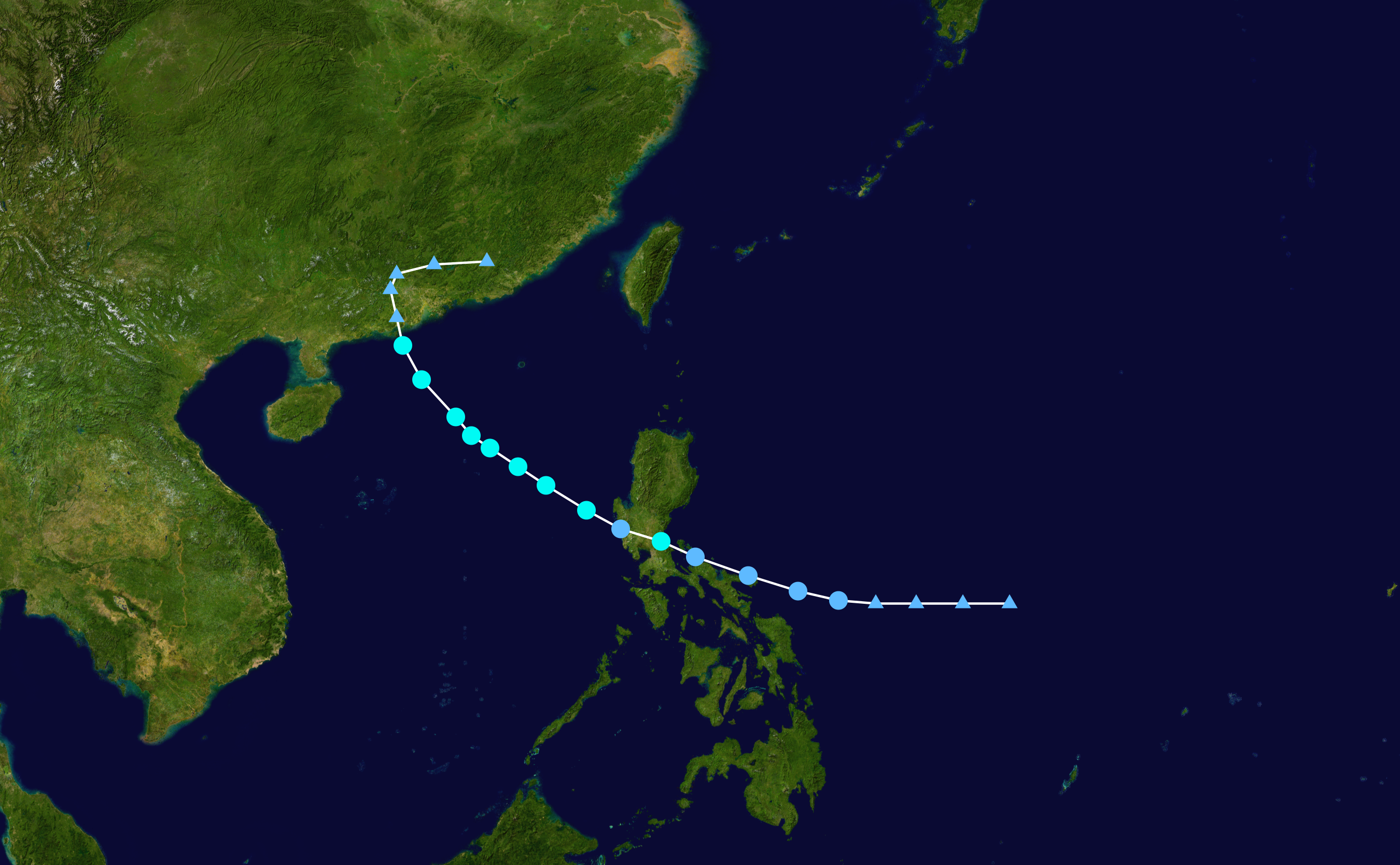
- Duration: October 11 – October 15
- Peak intensity: 85 km/h (50 mph) (1-min); 1000 hPa (mbar)

Tropical Storm 17W formed on October 11. Later, it hit the Philippines as a tropical depression once, then again as a tropical depression, but actually strengthened to tropical storm strength while over land. It continued west-northwest until it struck China. It dissipated around the same moment it made landfall on October 15. 16W had maximum sustained winds of 50 mph and a minimum central pressure of 1000 mbar.

=== Super Typhoon Judy ===
- Typhoon (JMA)
- Category 4 super typhoon (SSHWS)
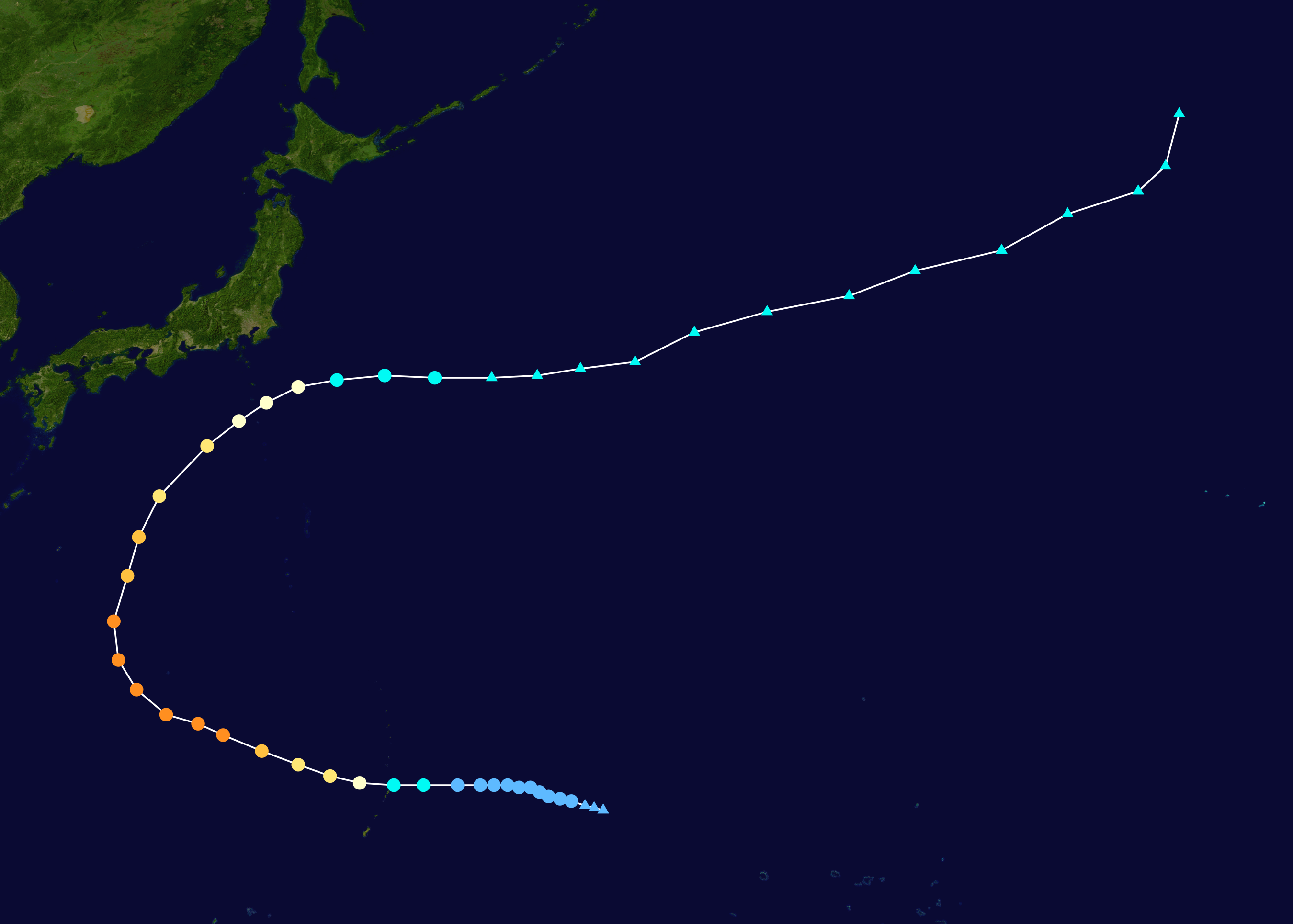
- Duration: October 19 – October 26
- Peak intensity: 240 km/h (150 mph) (1-min); 960 hPa (mbar)

Judy formed on October 19, in the open Pacific. It moved westward and strengthened into a super typhoon with maximum sustained winds of 150 mph and a minimum central pressure of 960 mbar. It then began to curve north, therefore weakening. Judy passed by Japan, but far away enough to avoid damage. Soon after that, it began to move east and then east-northeast as a tropical storm. Judy dissipated on October 30, just over the Date Line.

=== Super Typhoon Kit ===
- Typhoon (JMA)
- Category 5 super typhoon (SSHWS)
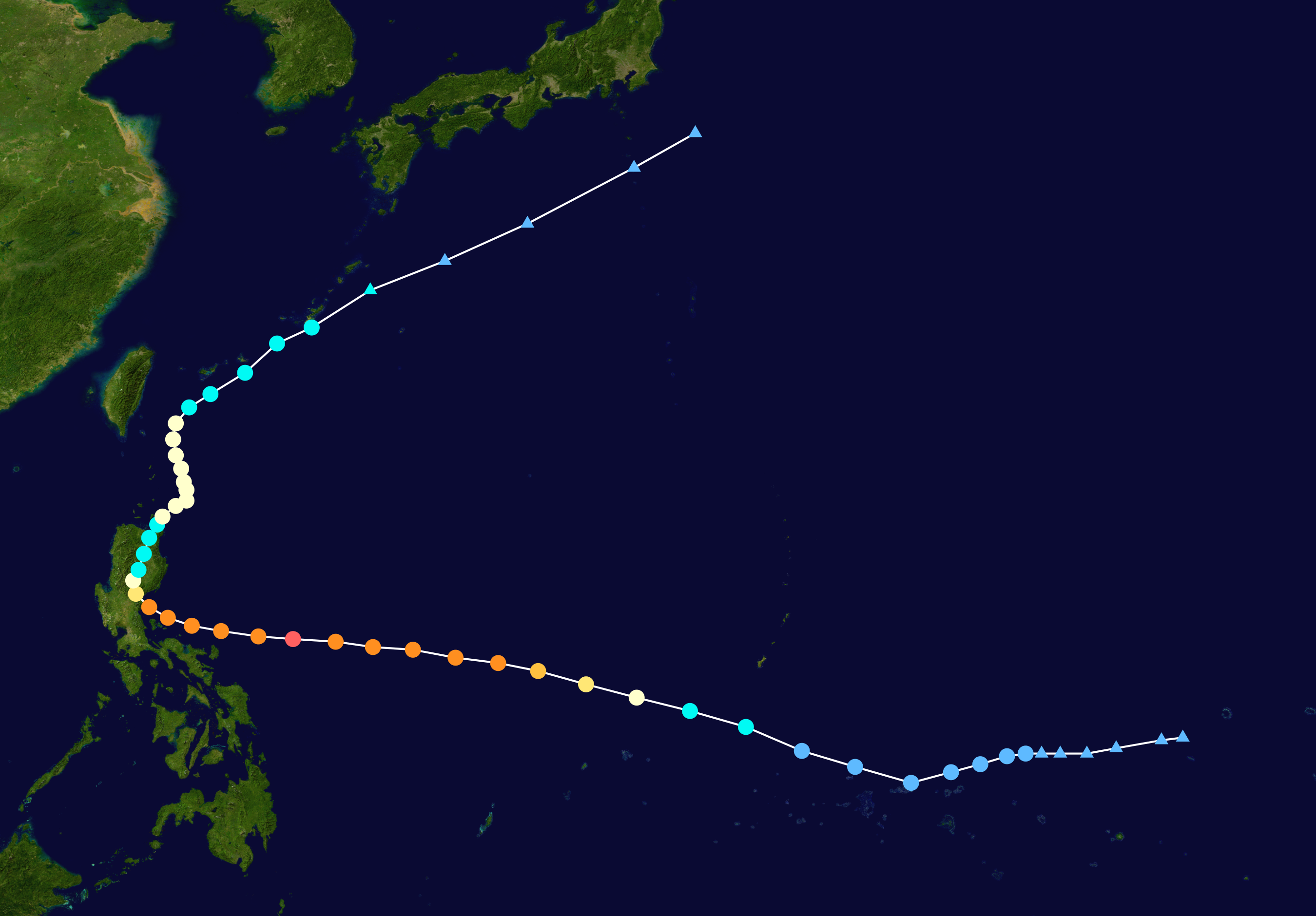
- Duration: November 4 – November 16
- Peak intensity: 260 km/h (160 mph) (1-min); 910 hPa (mbar)

On November 6, Kit formed in the same general area as Super Typhoon Judy did. It moved westward and slowly strengthened. But after reaching tropical storm-strength, Kit's intensification rapidly quickened. It briefly became a category five super typhoon with maximum sustained winds of 160 mph and a minimum central pressure of 910 mbar. After weakening slightly, Kit struck the northern Philippines as a Category 4 on November 11. After exiting land, Kit restrengthened into a Category 1 . It became extratropical on November 17 and dissipated shortly thereafter.

Torrential rains and high winds impacted much of northern Luzon, Philippines during a country-wide election. Nearly half of the 7.2 million people expected to vote were effected by the typhoon. Severe property damage took place and at least 19 people were killed in the country as a result of the storm. Thousands of people were also left homeless in the wake of the typhoon.

=== Super Typhoon Lola ===
- Typhoon (JMA)
- Category 5 super typhoon (SSHWS)
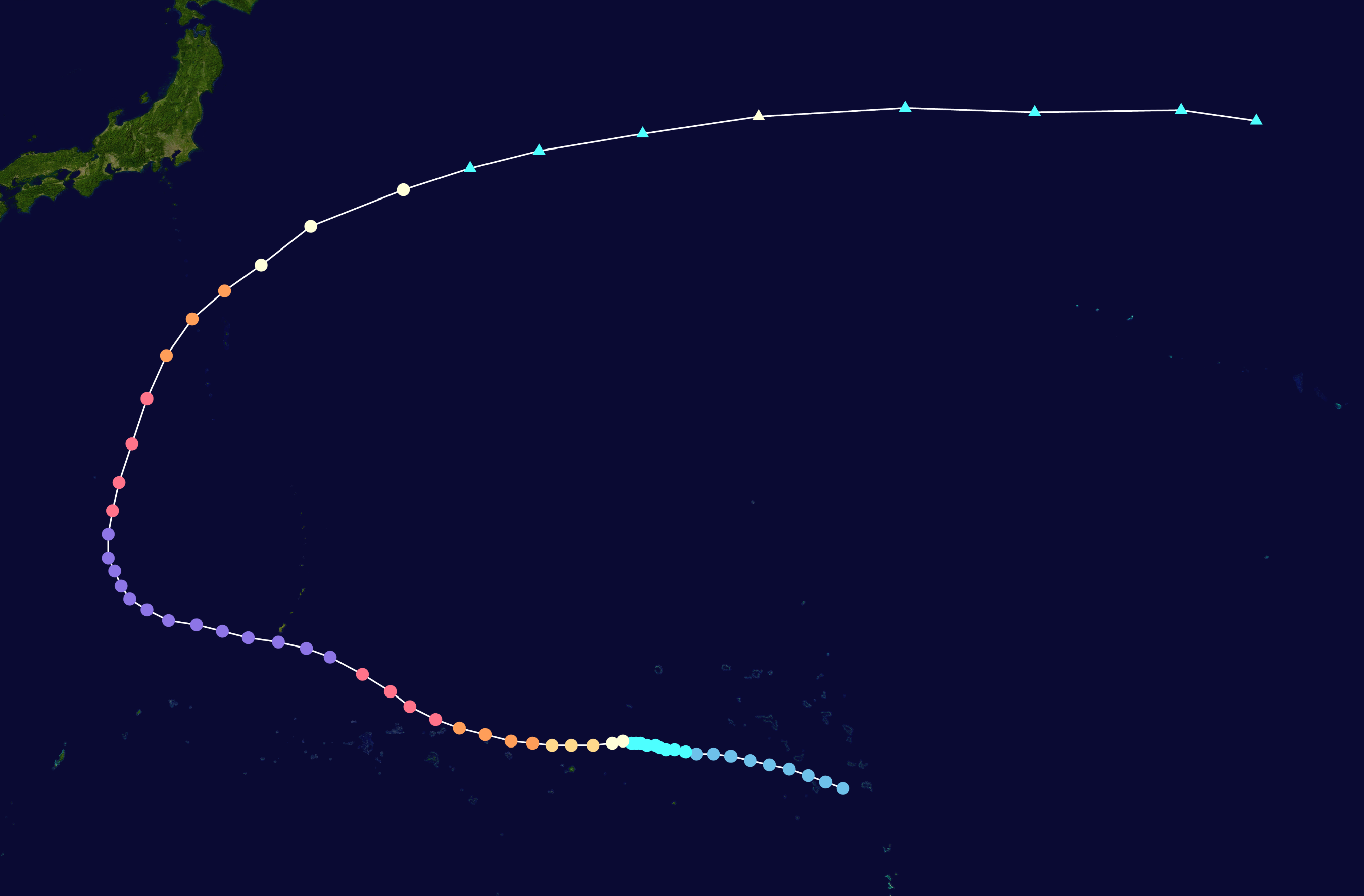
- Duration: November 8 – November 20
- Peak intensity: 295 km/h (185 mph) (1-min); 900 hPa (mbar)

Lola formed on November 7 in the open Pacific. It moved west for a while before it shifted to a more northern position. It was shortly after that Lola had maximum sustained winds of 185 mph and a minimum central pressure of 900 mbar. Then Lola weakened and slowly curved east. It weakened to a tropical storm, then back to category one. But Lola was too far north to retain the strength and weakened even more. Lola dissipated on November 22, well over the Dateline. At some point, Lola hit Guam and caused areas in Merizo to flood four to five feet. In addition, damage was recorded in the Bikini Atoll after Lola passed near Kili Island. Crops were destroyed and the island's supply ship was sunk.

=== Typhoon Mamie ===
- Typhoon (JMA)
- Category 3 typhoon (SSHWS)
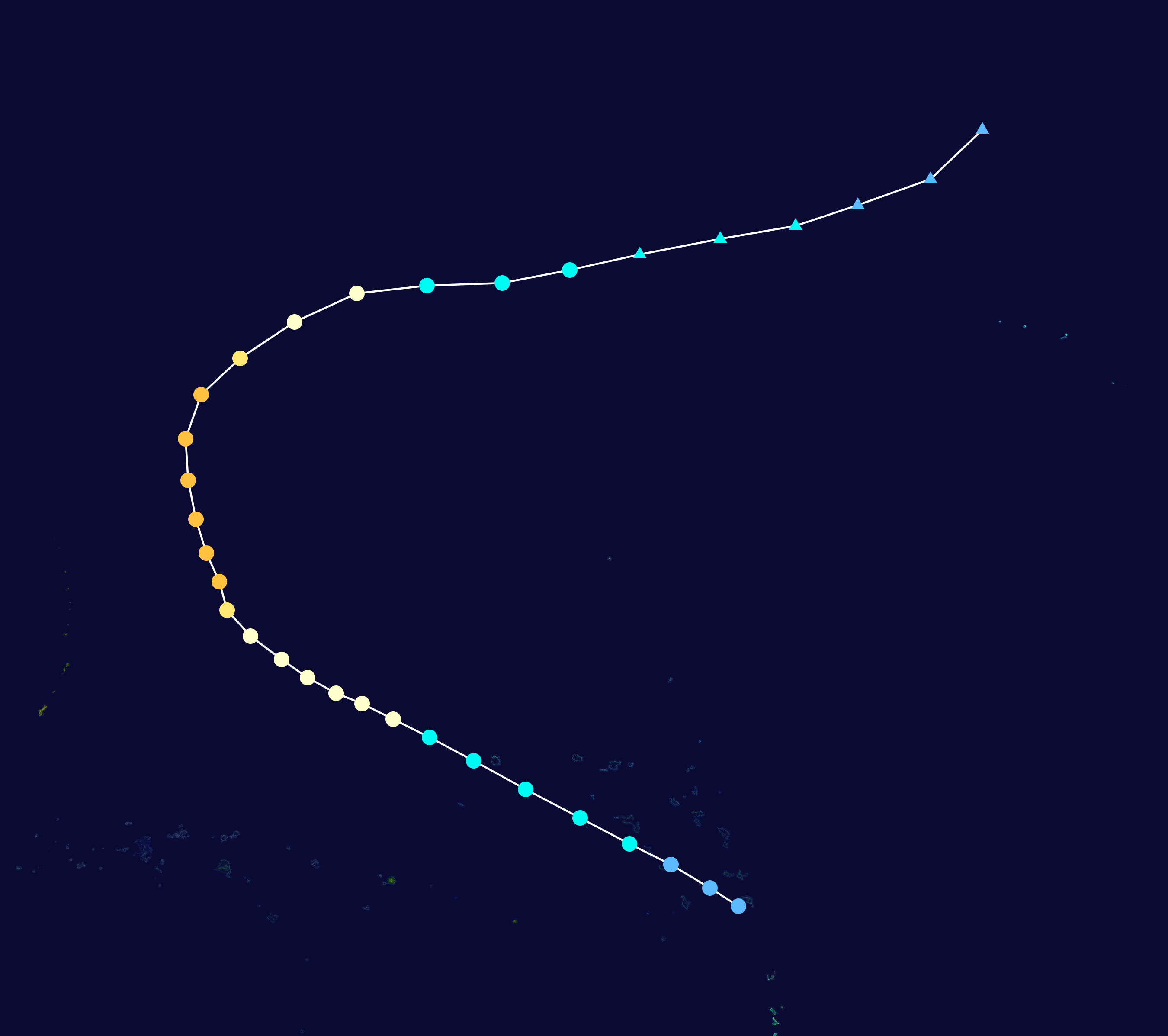
- Duration: November 17 – November 23
- Peak intensity: 205 km/h (125 mph) (1-min); 960 hPa (mbar)

On November 17, Tropical Storm Mamie developed over the open Pacific Ocean, in a way similar to Typhoon Lola's formation, but moved northwest instead. As soon as Mamie began to curved north, it attained its maximum sustained winds of 125 mph and minimum central pressure of 960 mbar. But then it moved east-northeast and rapidly weakened. Mamie moved north and became extratropical on November 24, and dissipated on November 25.

== Season statistics ==
=== Impact ===
This table summarizes the death toll for selected cyclones. This table is restricted to storms that threatened land only. The color behind the date and location of landfall indicates its strength at that landfall or near miss.

Death toll (summary)
Name	Date of strike	Location	Deaths
01W	January 6	Near Leyte, the Philippines	NA
Virginia	June 25	Near Pl-Lam, Taiwan	86
Virginia	June 27	Near Nagasaki, Japan	86
Wendy	July 14	Near Isabela, Philippines	100
Wendy	July 16	Near Hong Kong	100
Agnes	August 21	Gyeongsangnam-do, South Korea	NA
Agnes	August 21	Primorsky Krai, Russia	NA
08W	August 18	Hainan, China	NA
08W	August 20	Guangdong, China	NA
unnamed	August 23	Kōchi, Japan	NA
Bess	September 6	Kagoshima, Japan	NA
Bess	September 7	Ehime, Japan	NA
Bess	September 7	Akita, Japan	NA
Carmen	September 15	Fujian, China	NA
Faye			79
Gloria	September 20	Isabela, Philippines	NA
Gloria	September 22	Macau, Portugal (now China)	NA
Irma	September 12	Nam Trung Bộ, Vietnam	NA
16W	September 12	Camarines Sur, Philippines	NA
16W	September 13	Quezon, Philippines	NA
16W	September 15	Guangdong, China	NA
Kit	September 11	Aurora, Philippines	NA

== Storm names ==
The names use are the same as when they were last used, except for Virginia and Wendy, which replaced Vae and Wilma.

- Agnes 07W
- Bess 09W
- Carmen 10W
- Della
- Elaine 11W
- Faye 13W
- Gloria 13W
- Hester 14W
- Irma 15W
- Judy 17W
- Kit 18W
- Lola 19W
- Mamie 20W
- Nina
- Ophelia
- Phyllis
- Rita
- Susan
- Tess
- Viola
- Winnie
- Alice
- Betty
- Cora
- Doris
- Elsie
- Flossie
- Grace
- Helen
- Ida
- June
- Kathy
- Lorna
- Marie
- Nancy
- Olga
- Pamela
- Ruby
- Sally
- Tilda
- Violet
- Wilda
- Anita
- Billie
- Clara
- Dot
- Ellen
- Fran
- Georgia
- Hope
- Iris
- Joan
- Kate
- Louise
- Marge
- Nora
- Opal
- Patsy
- Ruth
- Sarah
- Thelma
- Vera
- Wanda
- Amy
- Babs
- Charlotte
- Dinah
- Emma
- Freda
- Gilda
- Harriet
- Ivy
- Jean
- Karen
- Lucille
- Mary
- Nadine
- Olive
- Polly
- Rose 02W
- Shirley 03W
- Trix 04W
- Virginia 05W
- Wendy 06W

One eastern Pacific storm, Hurricane Della, crossed into this basin. It became Typhoon Della, keeping its original name (even though its name was from the West Pacific list) and "C" suffix. In addition, Hurricane Nina formed in the Central Pacific, and remained in the basin. It received a name on the West Pacific list; but doesn't count as part of the 1957 Pacific typhoon season.

== See also ==
- List of Pacific typhoon seasons
- 1957 Atlantic hurricane season
- 1957 Pacific hurricane season
- Australian region cyclone seasons: 1956–57 1957–58
- South Pacific cyclone seasons: 1956–57 1957–58
- South-West Indian Ocean cyclone seasons: 1956–57 1957–58
