= 1971 hurricane season =

1971 hurricane season may refer to:

- The 1971 Atlantic hurricane season
- The 1971 Pacific hurricane season
