= 1971 North Indian Ocean cyclone season =

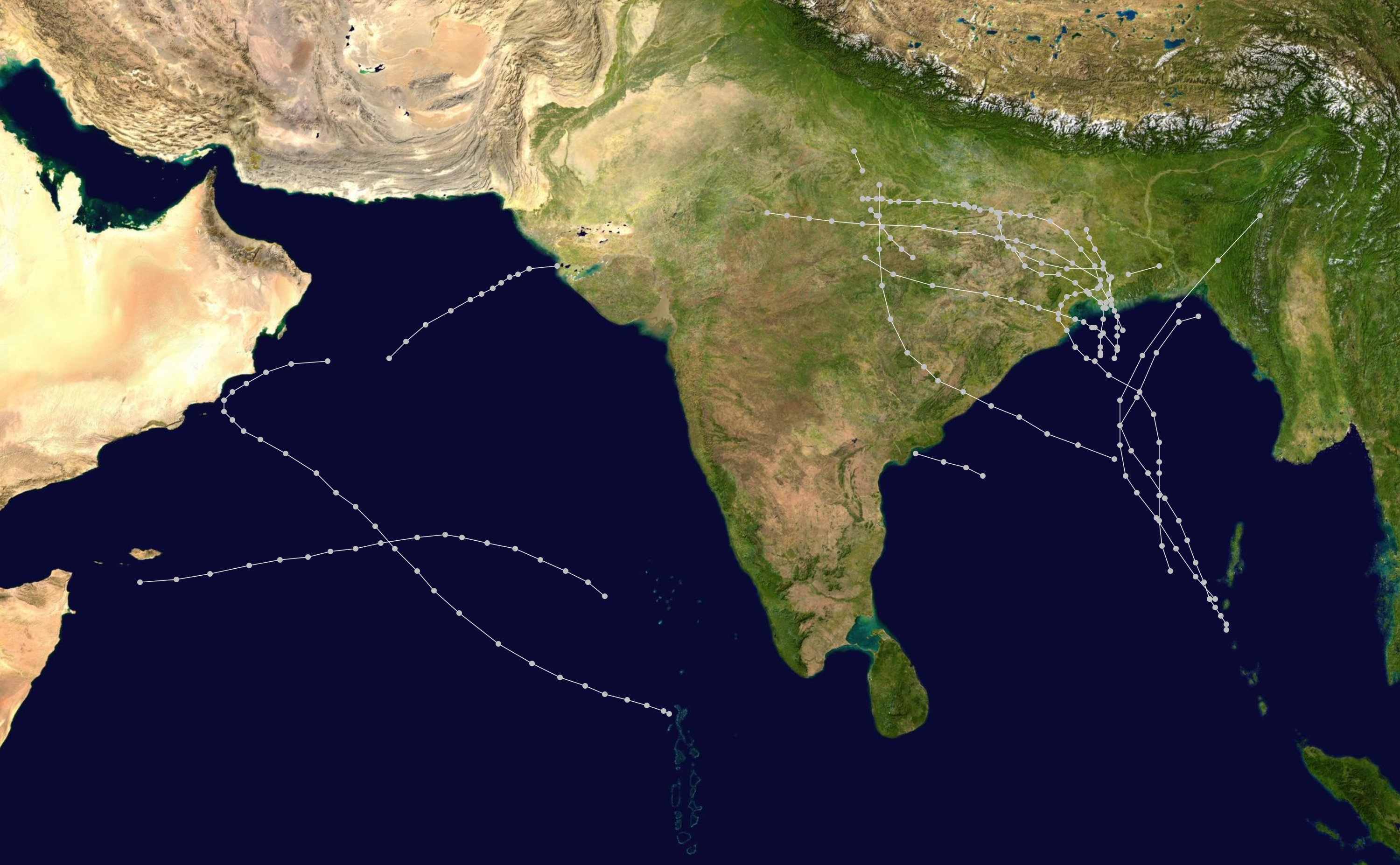
- Season summary map

Seasonal boundaries
- First system formed: May 3, 1971
- Last system dissipated: December 21, 1971

Seasonal statistics
- Deep depressions: 15
- Cyclonic storms: 7
- Severe cyclonic storms: 5
- Total fatalities: >10,860
- Total damage: Unknown

Related articles
- 1971 Atlantic hurricane season; 1971 Pacific hurricane season; 1971 Pacific typhoon season

The 1971 North Indian Ocean cyclone season was part of the annual cycle of tropical cyclone formation. The season has no official bounds but cyclones tend to form between April and December. These dates conventionally delimit the period of each year when most tropical cyclones form in the northern Indian Ocean. There are two main seas in the North Indian Ocean—the Bay of Bengal to the east of the Indian subcontinent and the Arabian Sea to the west of India. The official Regional Specialized Meteorological Centre in this basin is the India Meteorological Department (IMD), while the Joint Typhoon Warning Center (JTWC) releases unofficial advisories. An average of five tropical cyclones form in the North Indian Ocean every season with peaks in May and November. Cyclones occurring between the meridians 45°E and 100°E are included in the season by the IMD.

== Systems ==
=== Depression One (01B) ===
- Depression (IMD)
- Tropical storm (SSHWS)
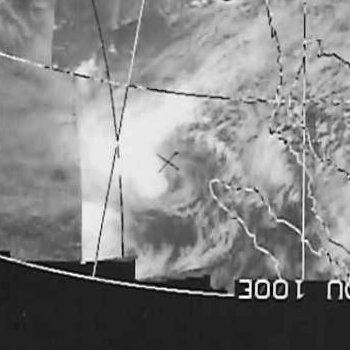
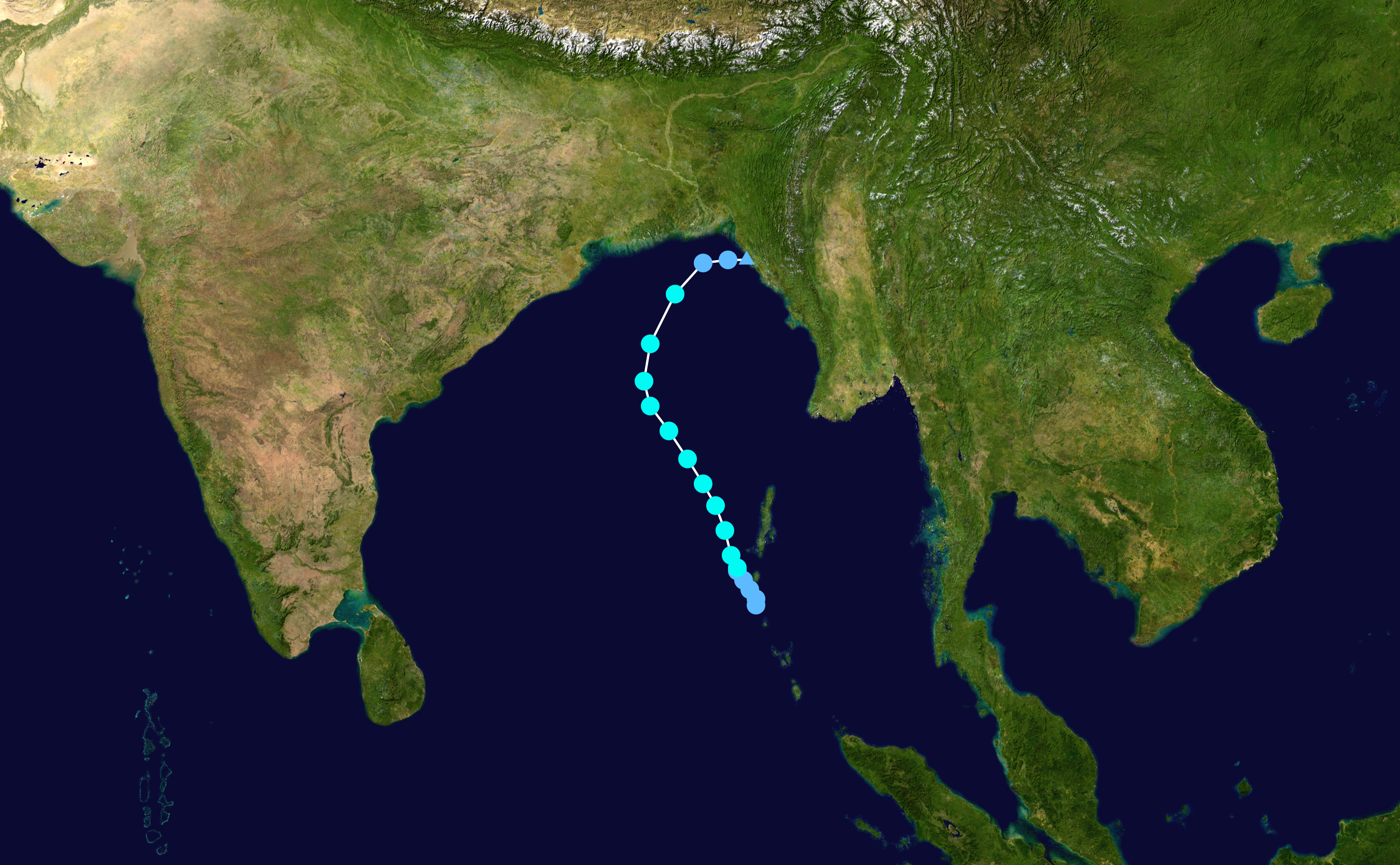
- Duration: May 3 – May 8
- Peak intensity: 45 km/h (30 mph) (3-min);

=== Cyclonic Storm Three (03B) ===
- Cyclonic storm (IMD)
- Tropical storm (SSHWS)
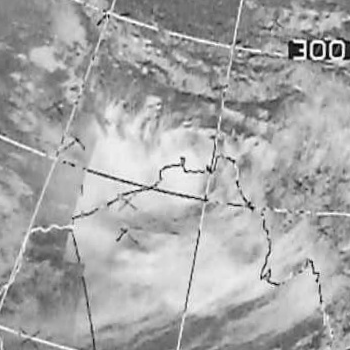
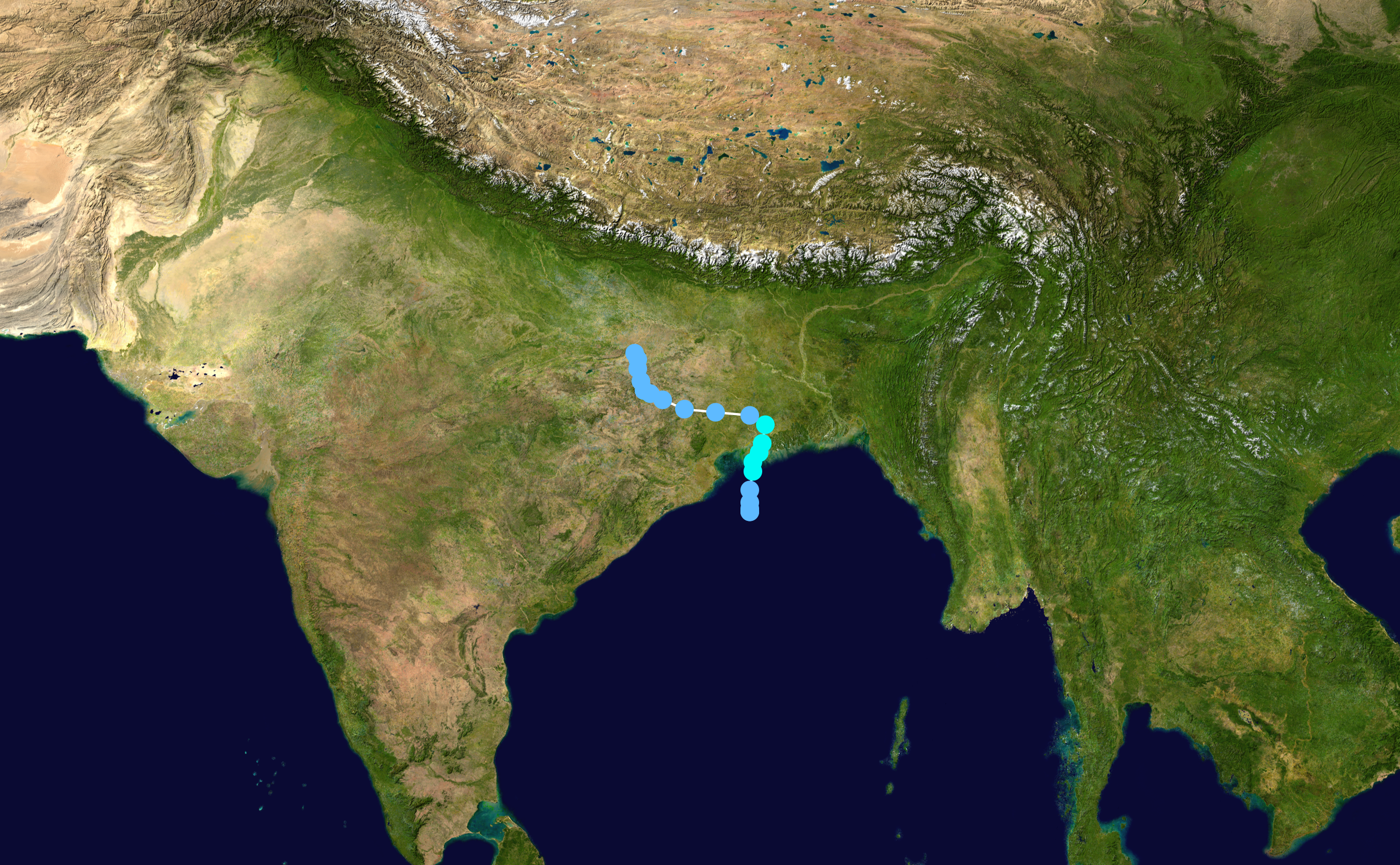
- Duration: June 3 – June 8
- Peak intensity: 85 km/h (50 mph) (3-min);

=== Severe Cyclonic Storm Ten (10B) ===
- Severe cyclonic storm (IMD)
- Category 1 tropical cyclone (SSHWS)
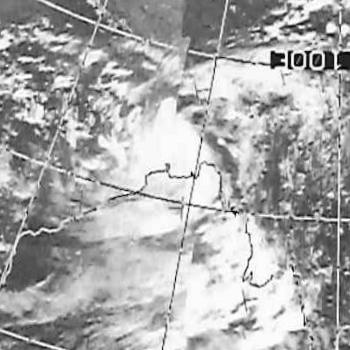
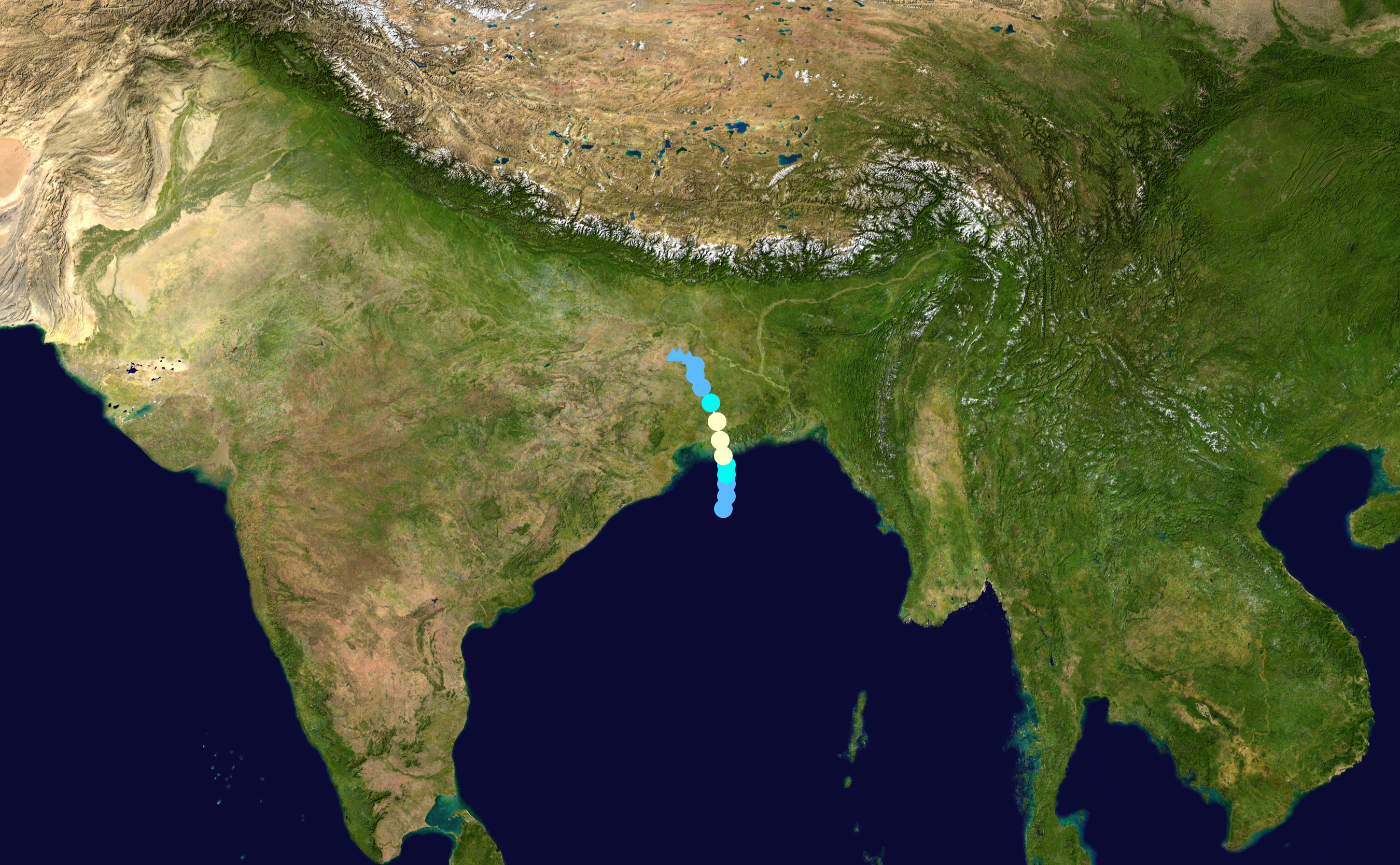
- Duration: September 27 – October 1
- Peak intensity: 95 km/h (60 mph) (3-min);

This cyclone was formed on September 27 and peaked as a Category-1 equivalent storm. On September 30, the storm made landfall over Sunderbans and dissipated over the state of Bihar by the next day. 60 people were killed due to the storm.

=== Extremely Cyclonic Storm Twelve (12B) ===
- Extremely severe cyclonic storm (IMD)
- Category 3 tropical cyclone (SSHWS)
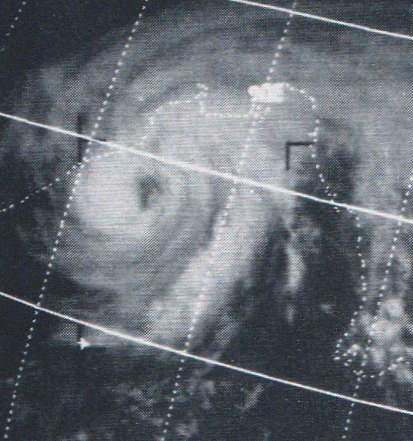
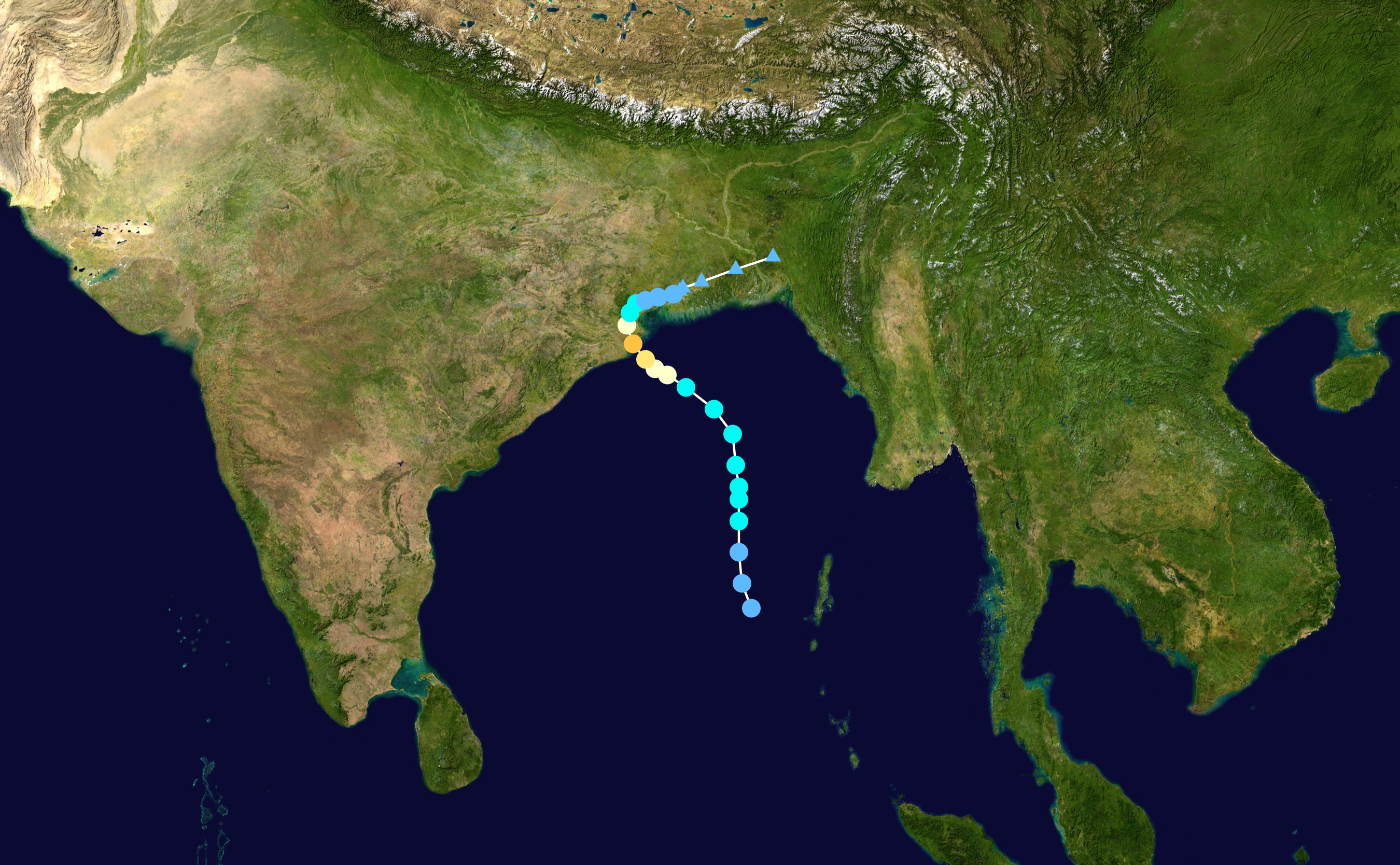
- Duration: October 27 – November 1
- Peak intensity: 165 km/h (105 mph) (3-min); 966 hPa (mbar)

On October 27 a tropical depression formed in the Bay of Bengal. It tracked northward, rapidly strengthened until reached a peak of 115 mph winds. The cyclone struck Paradip in Odisha, India, on October 29, and dissipated by the same day. The storm surge and flooding from the system caused 10,800 fatalities.

=== Severe Cyclonic Storm Thirteen (13A) ===
- Severe cyclonic storm (IMD)
- Category 1 tropical cyclone (SSHWS)
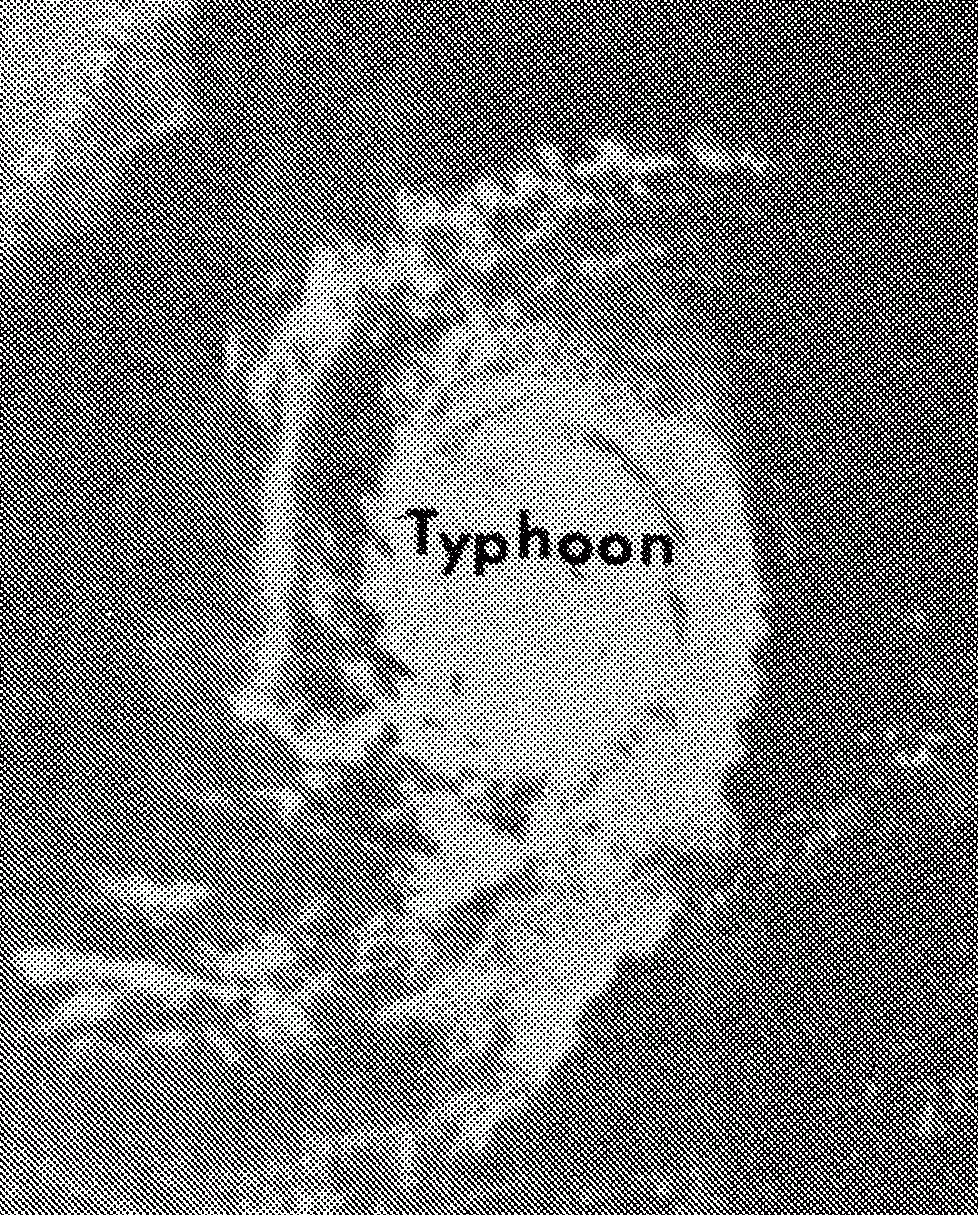
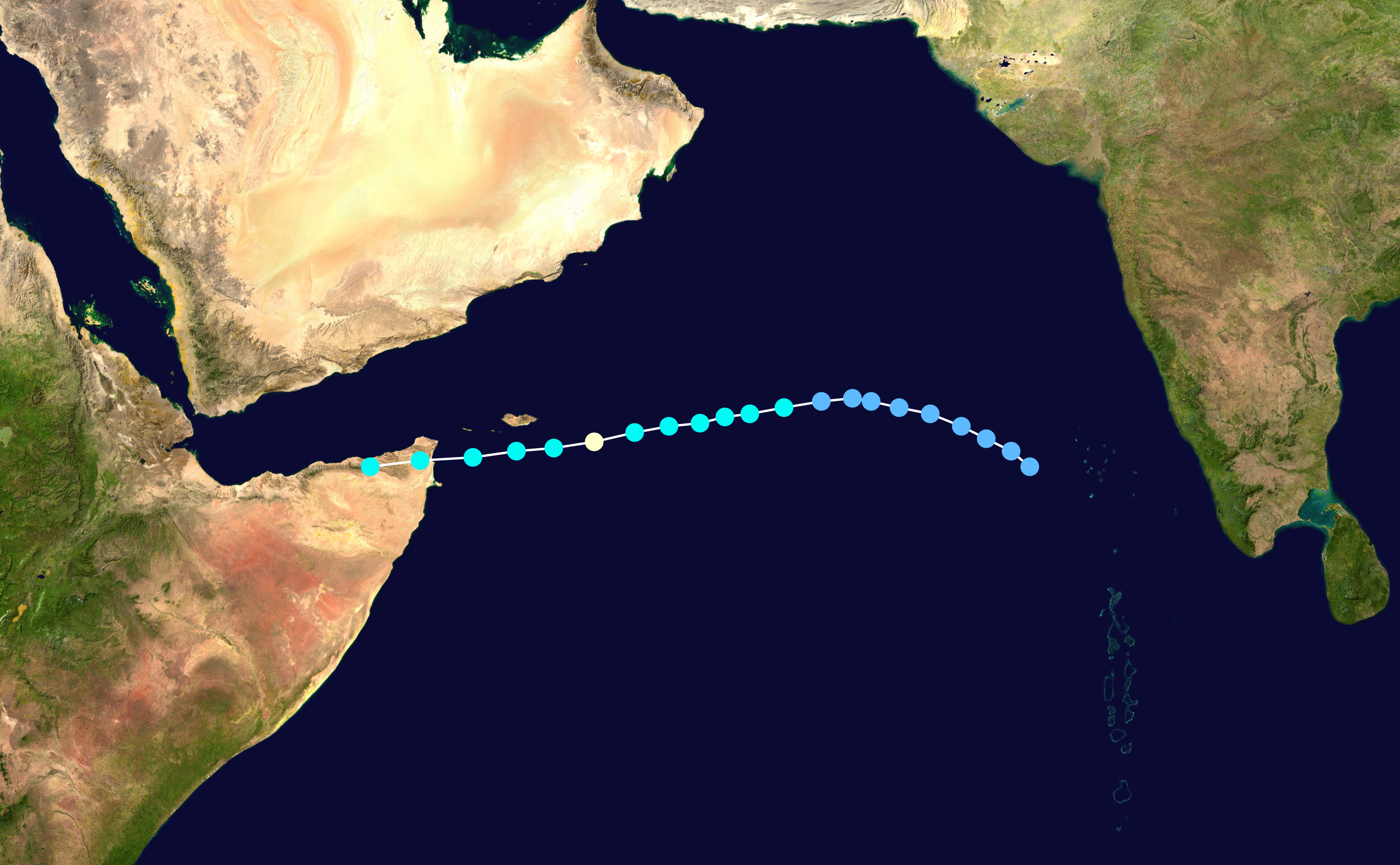
- Duration: October 27 – November 1
- Peak intensity: 110 km/h (70 mph) (3-min);

A tropical cyclone moved through the Arabian Sea near the end of October.

=== Severe Cyclonic Storm Fourteen (14B) ===
- Severe cyclonic storm (IMD)
- Category 1 tropical cyclone (SSHWS)
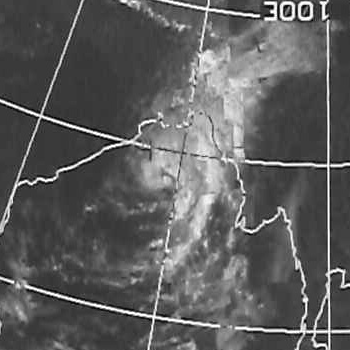
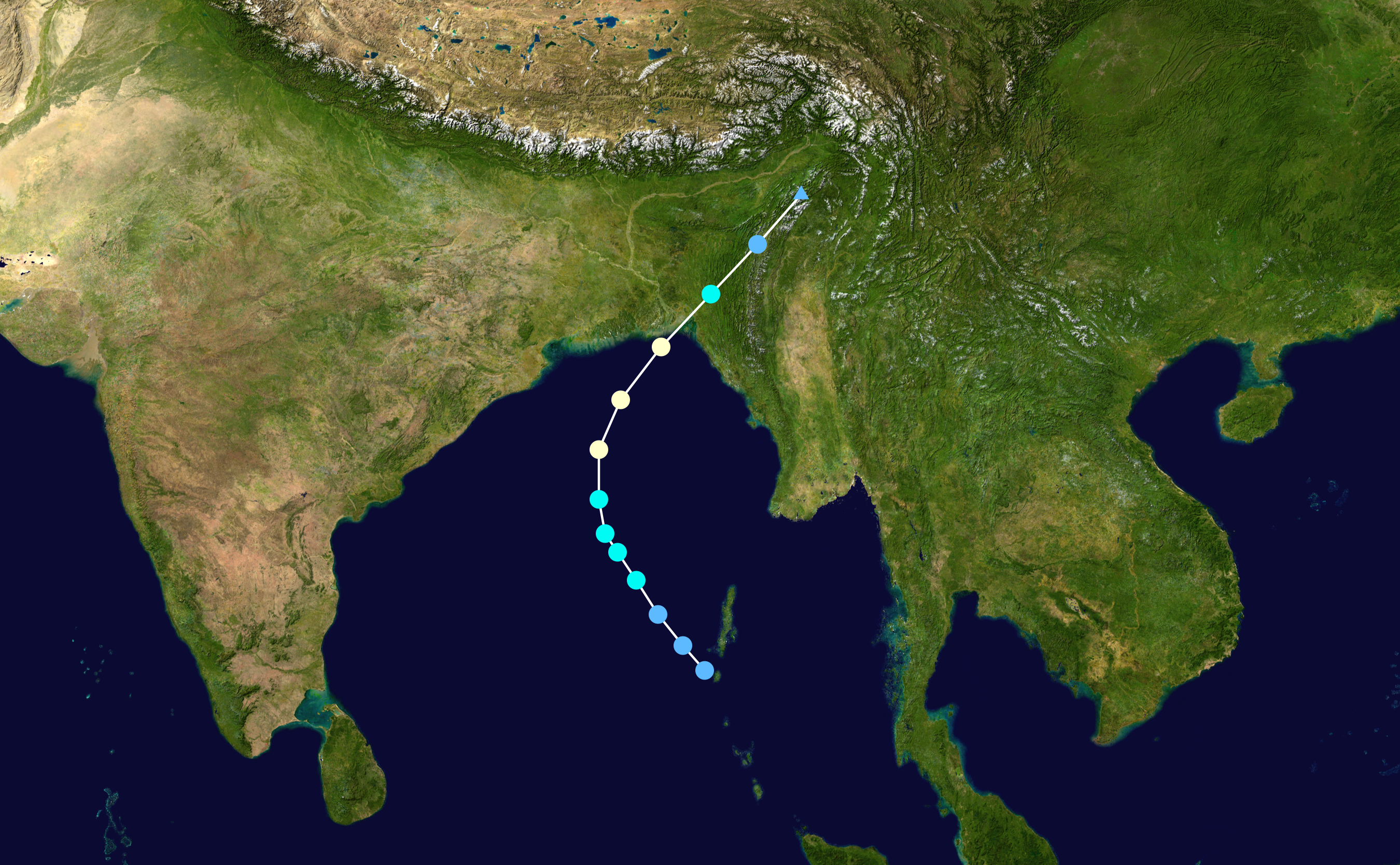
- Duration: November 3 – November 6
- Peak intensity: 100 km/h (65 mph) (3-min);

=== Very Severe Cyclonic Storm Fifteen (15A) ===
- Very severe cyclonic storm (IMD)
- Category 1 tropical cyclone (SSHWS)
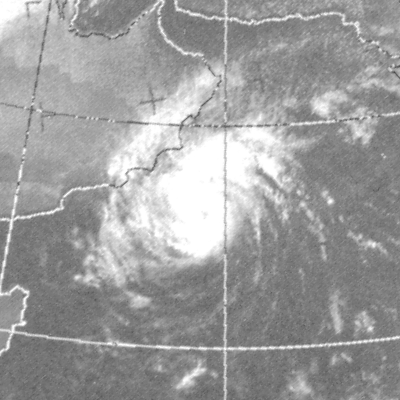
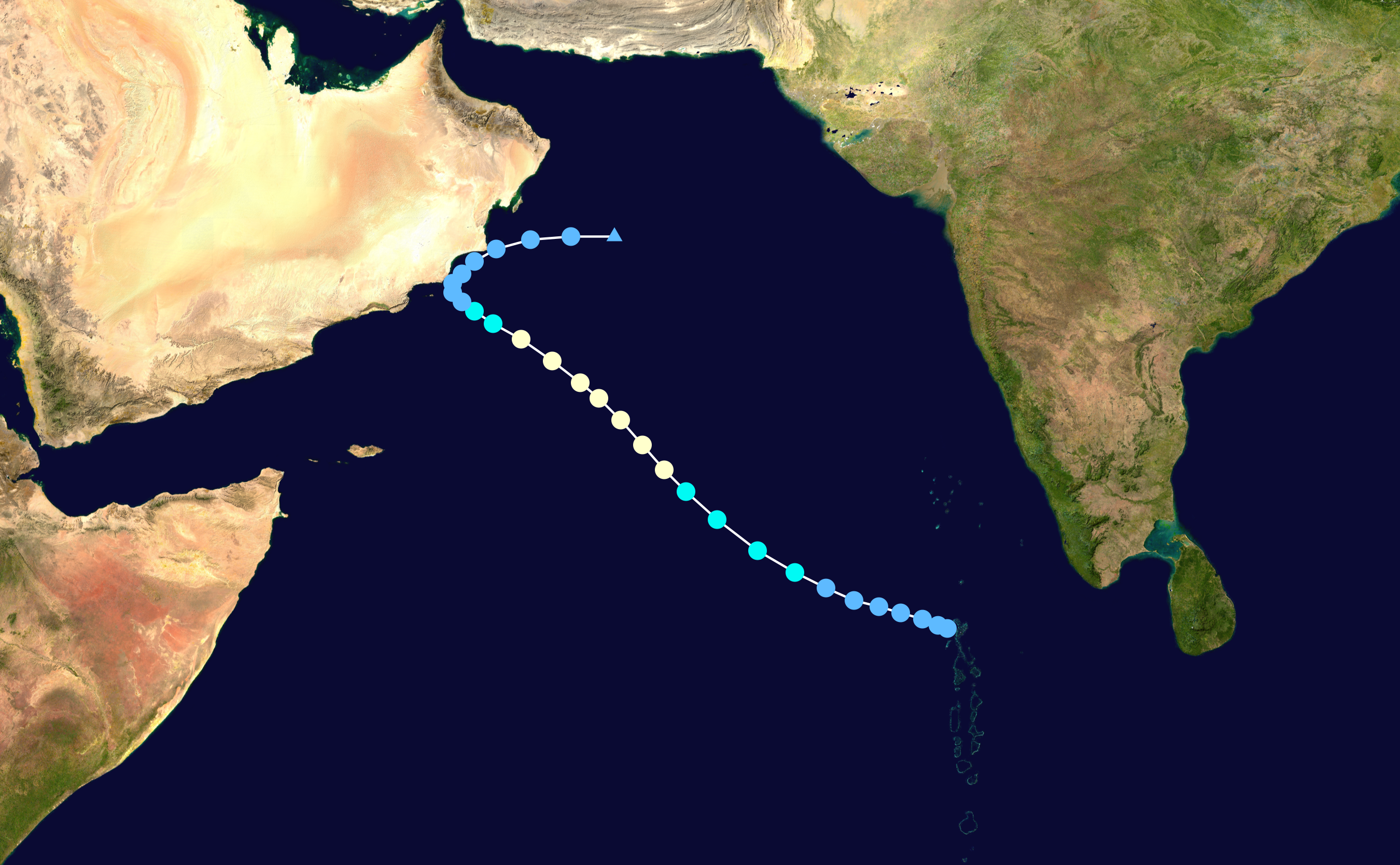
- Duration: December 14 – December 21
- Peak intensity: 130 km/h (80 mph) (3-min);

This was a rare cyclone which threatened the Arabian Peninsula in the month of December.

== See also ==
- North Indian Ocean tropical cyclone
- 1971 Atlantic hurricane season
- 1971 Pacific hurricane season
- 1971 Pacific typhoon season
- Australian cyclone seasons: 1970–71, 1971–72
- South Pacific cyclone seasons: 1970–71, 1971–72
- South-West Indian Ocean cyclone seasons: 1970–71, 1971–72
