= 1971–72 South-West Indian Ocean cyclone season =

Cyclone season in the Southwest Indian Ocean

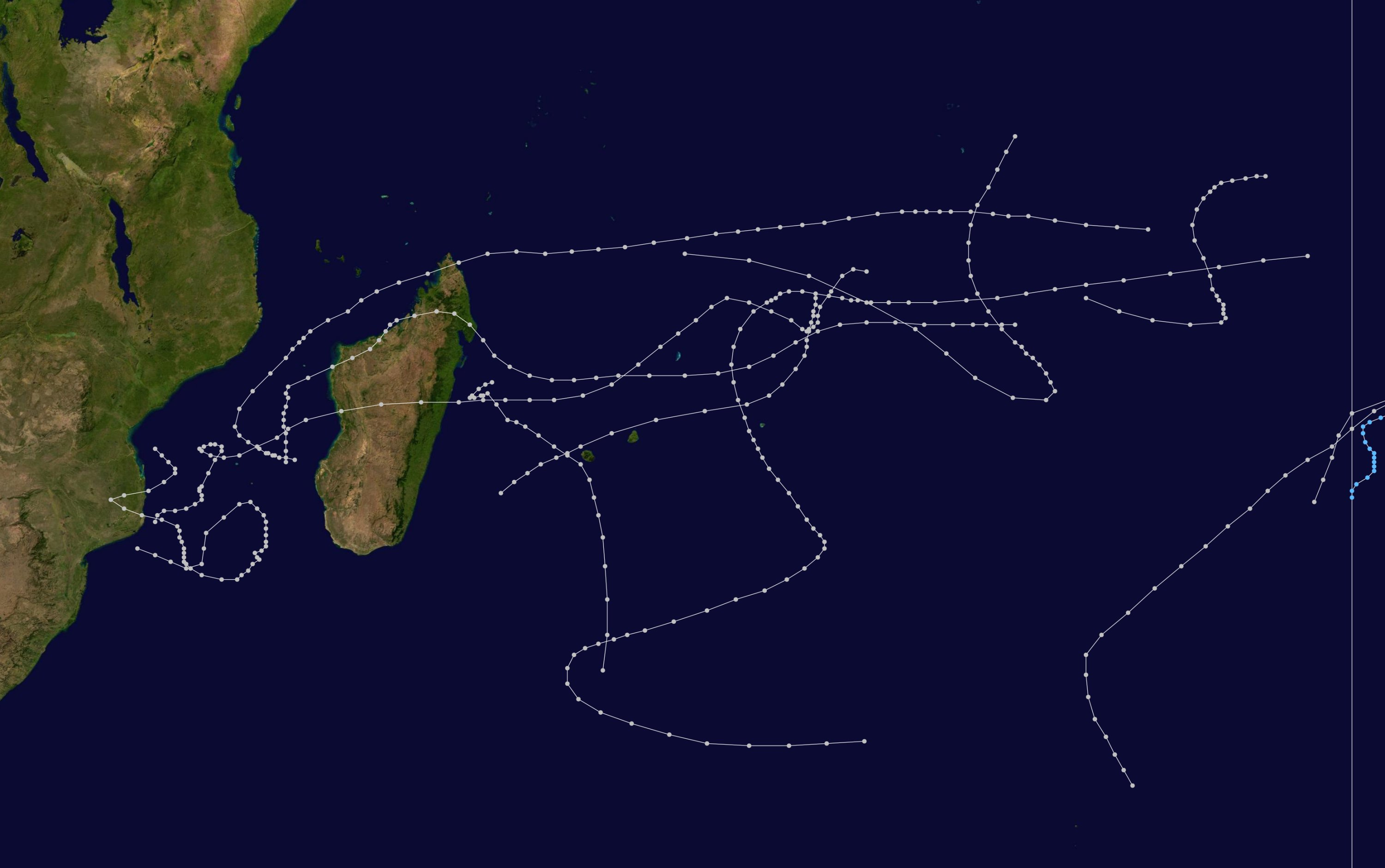
- Season summary map

Seasonal boundaries
- First system formed: 9 July 1971
- Last system dissipated: 11 March 1972

Strongest storm
- Name: Fabienne
  - Maximum winds: 215 km/h (130 mph) (10-minute sustained)
  - Lowest pressure: 967 hPa (mbar)

Seasonal statistics
- Total depressions: 9
- Total storms: 9
- Tropical cyclones: 4
- Intense tropical cyclones: 1
- Total fatalities: 7
- Total damage: Unknown

Related articles
- 1971–72 Australian region cyclone season; 1971–72 South Pacific cyclone season

The 1971–72 South-West Indian Ocean cyclone season was a below-average cyclone season. The season officially ran from November 1, 1971, to April 30, 1972.

== Systems ==
=== Moderate Tropical Storm Odette ===
- Moderate tropical storm (MFR)
- Tropical storm (SSHWS)
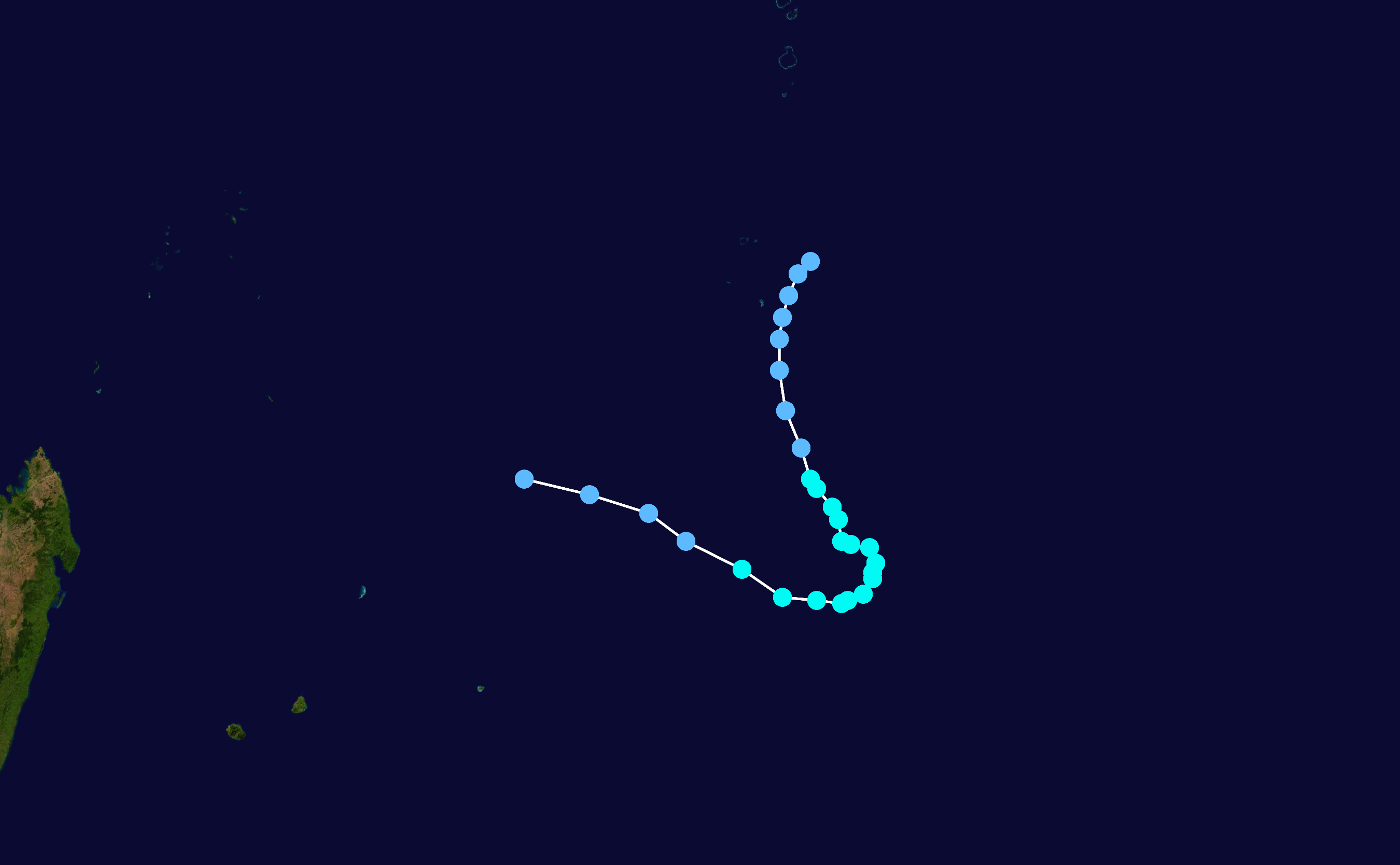
- Duration: July 9 – July 16
- Peak intensity: 65 km/h (40 mph) (10-min);

Odette existed from July 9 to July 16.

=== Severe Tropical Storm Agnes ===
- Severe tropical storm (MFR)
- Category 1 tropical cyclone (SSHWS)
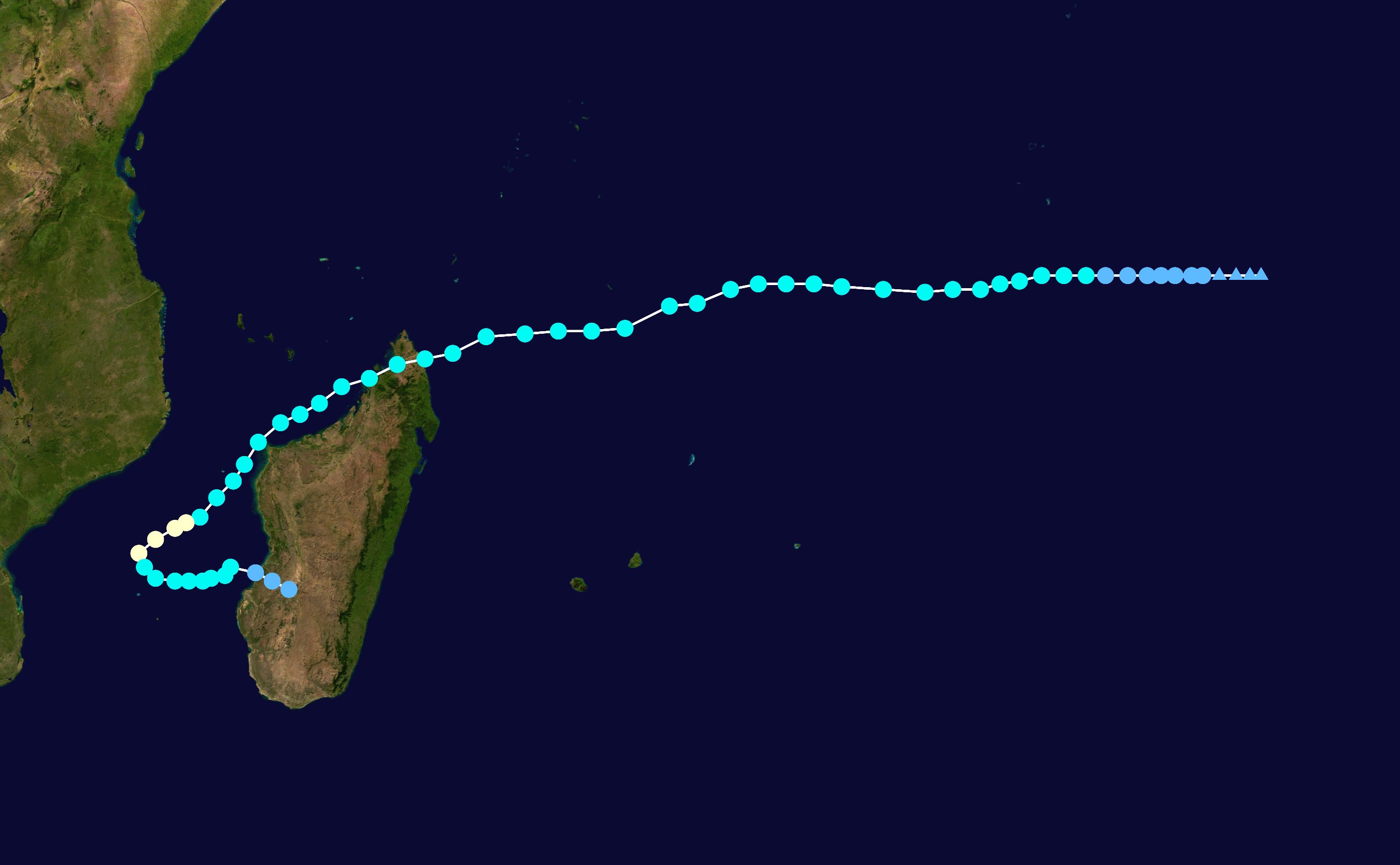
- Duration: December 9 – December 24
- Peak intensity: 110 km/h (70 mph) (10-min);

Agnes existed from December 9 to December 24. Rainbands from Agnes affected Réunion while the storm passed to the north.

=== Moderate Tropical Storm Belle ===
- Moderate tropical storm (MFR)
- Tropical storm (SSHWS)
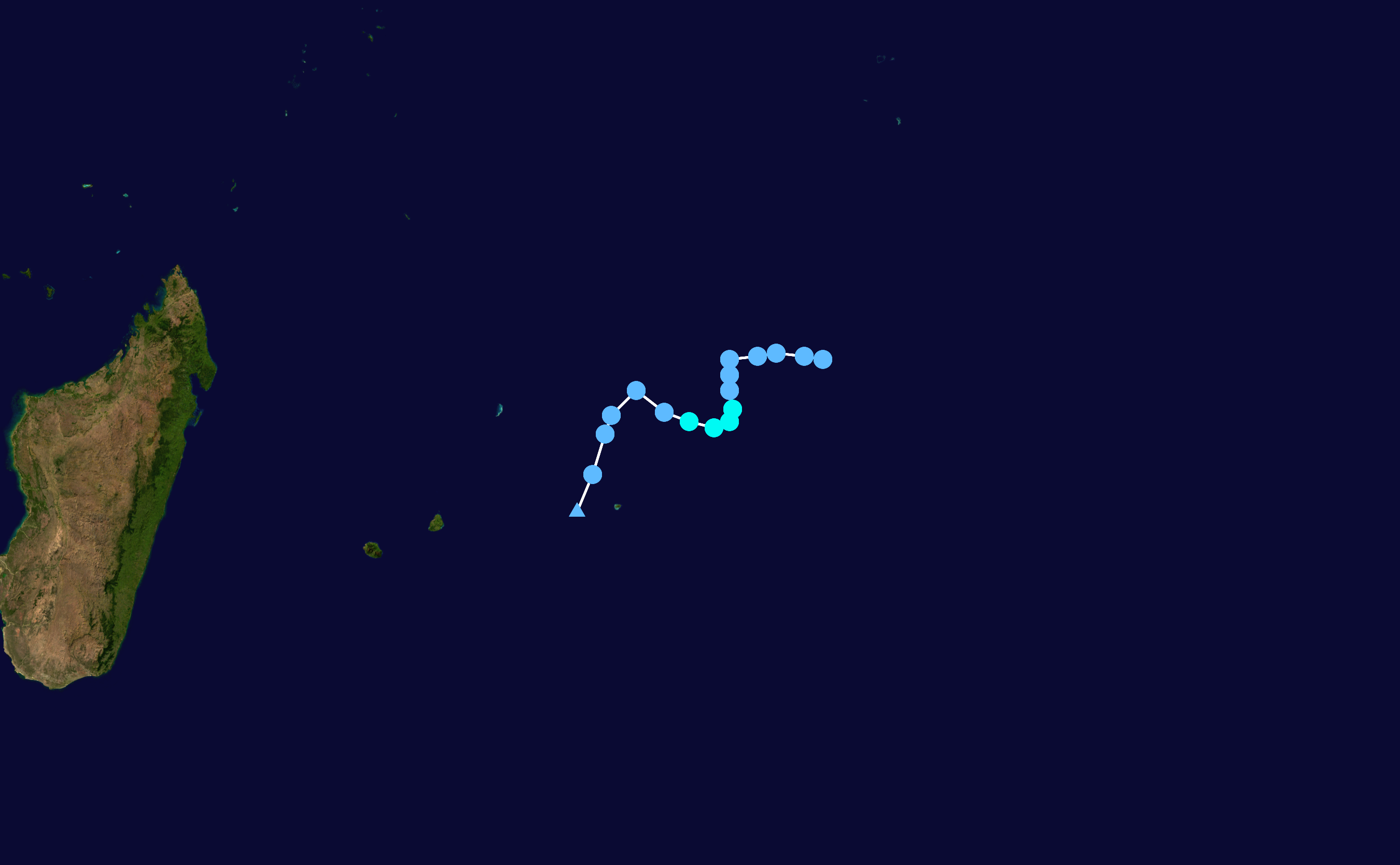
- Duration: January 1 – January 5
- Peak intensity: 65 km/h (40 mph) (10-min);

Belle existed from January 1 to January 5.

=== Moderate Tropical Storm Caroline ===
- Moderate tropical storm (MFR)
- Tropical storm (SSHWS)
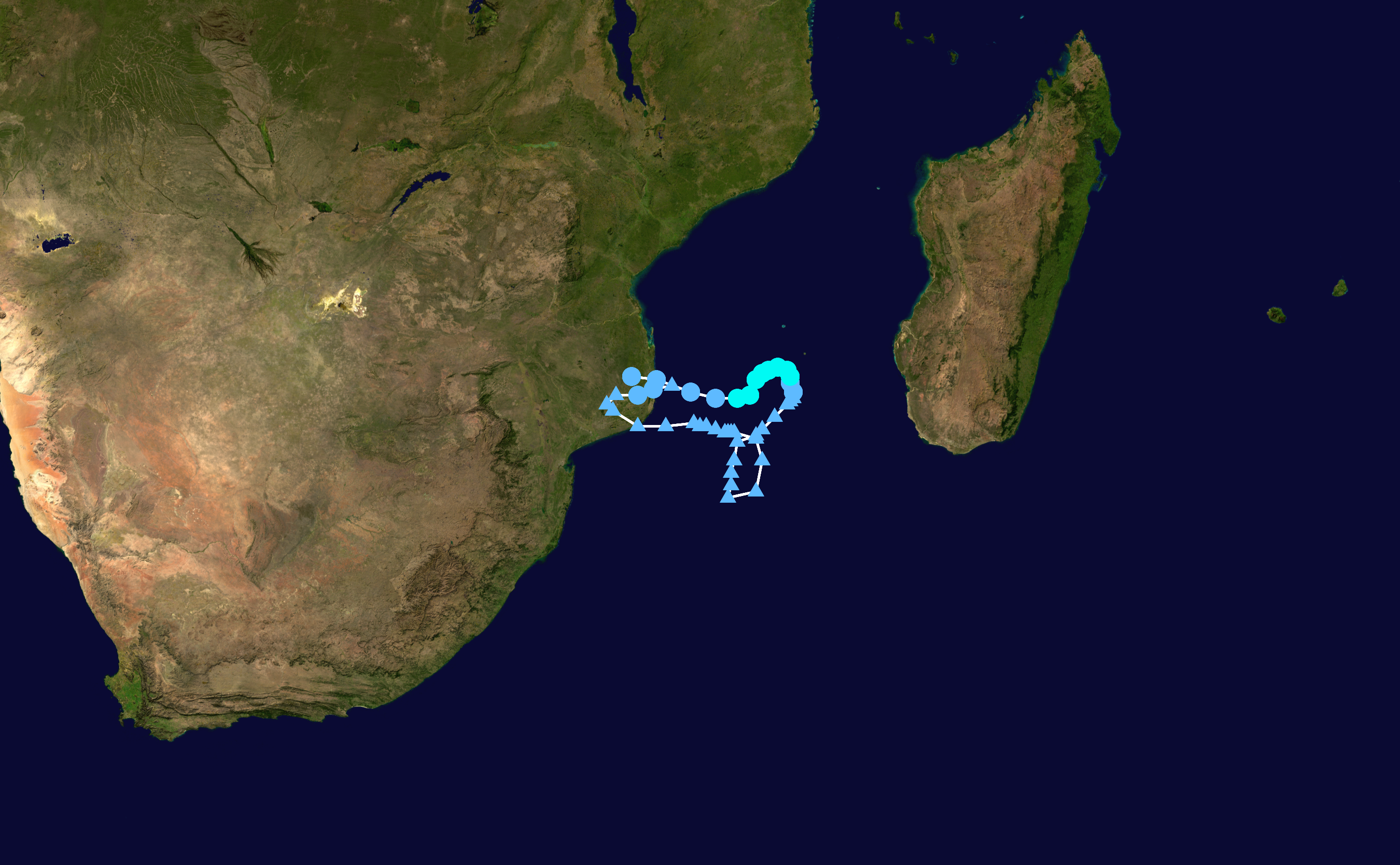
- Duration: February 3 – February 14
- Peak intensity: 65 km/h (40 mph) (10-min);

Caroline existed from February 3 to February 14.

=== Moderate Tropical Storm Dolly ===
- Moderate tropical storm (MFR)
- Tropical storm (SSHWS)
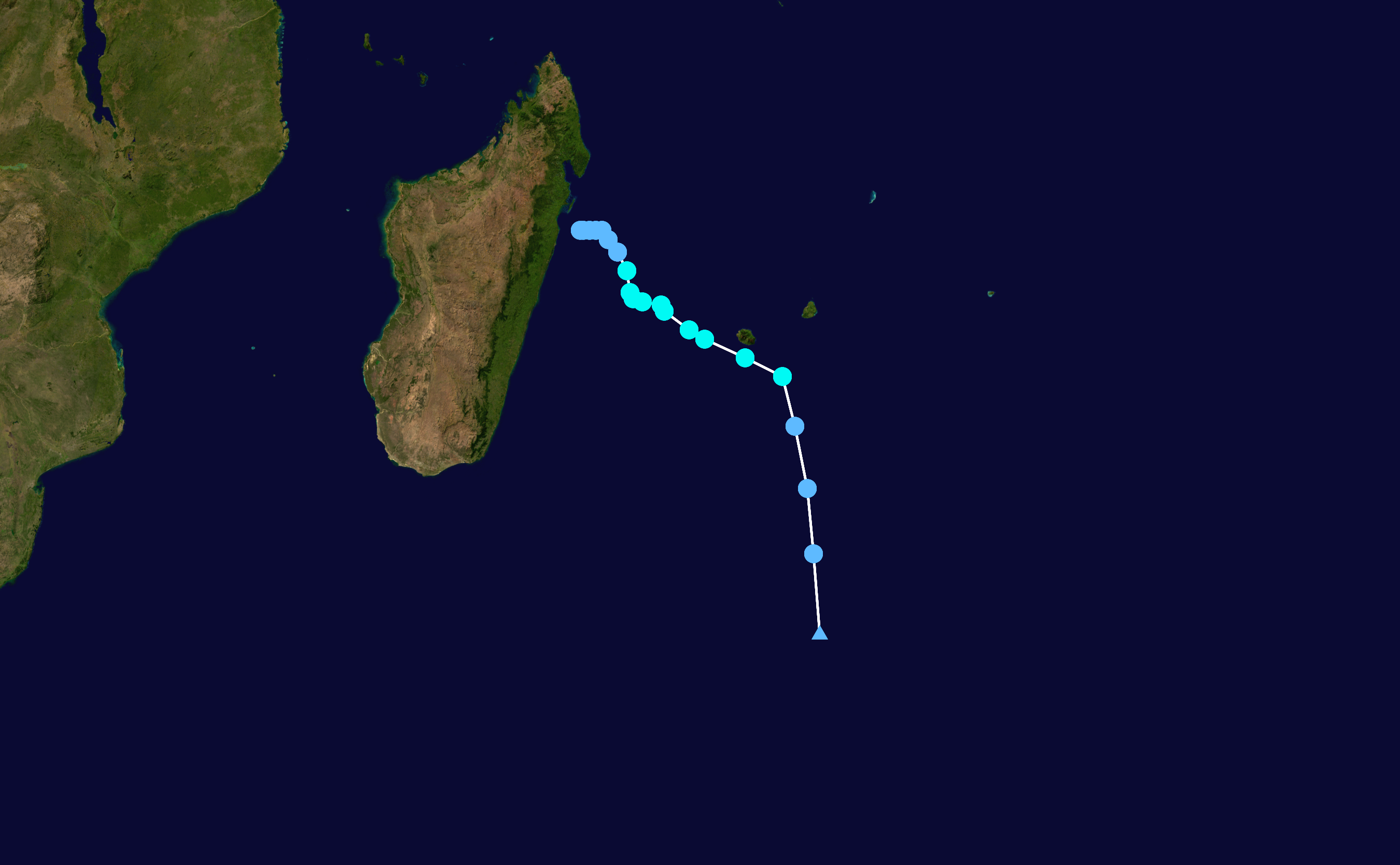
- Duration: February 4 – February 9
- Peak intensity: 65 km/h (40 mph) (10-min);

Dolly existed from February 4 to February 9. On February 7, Dolly brushed the southwest coast of Réunion, bringing days of heavy rainfall that reached 774 mm (30.5 in) at Piton Tortue. The rains damaged crops and flooded coastal roads. Dolly killed five people on the island.

=== Tropical Cyclone Eugenie ===
- Tropical cyclone (MFR)
- Category 1 tropical cyclone (SSHWS)
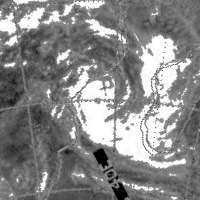
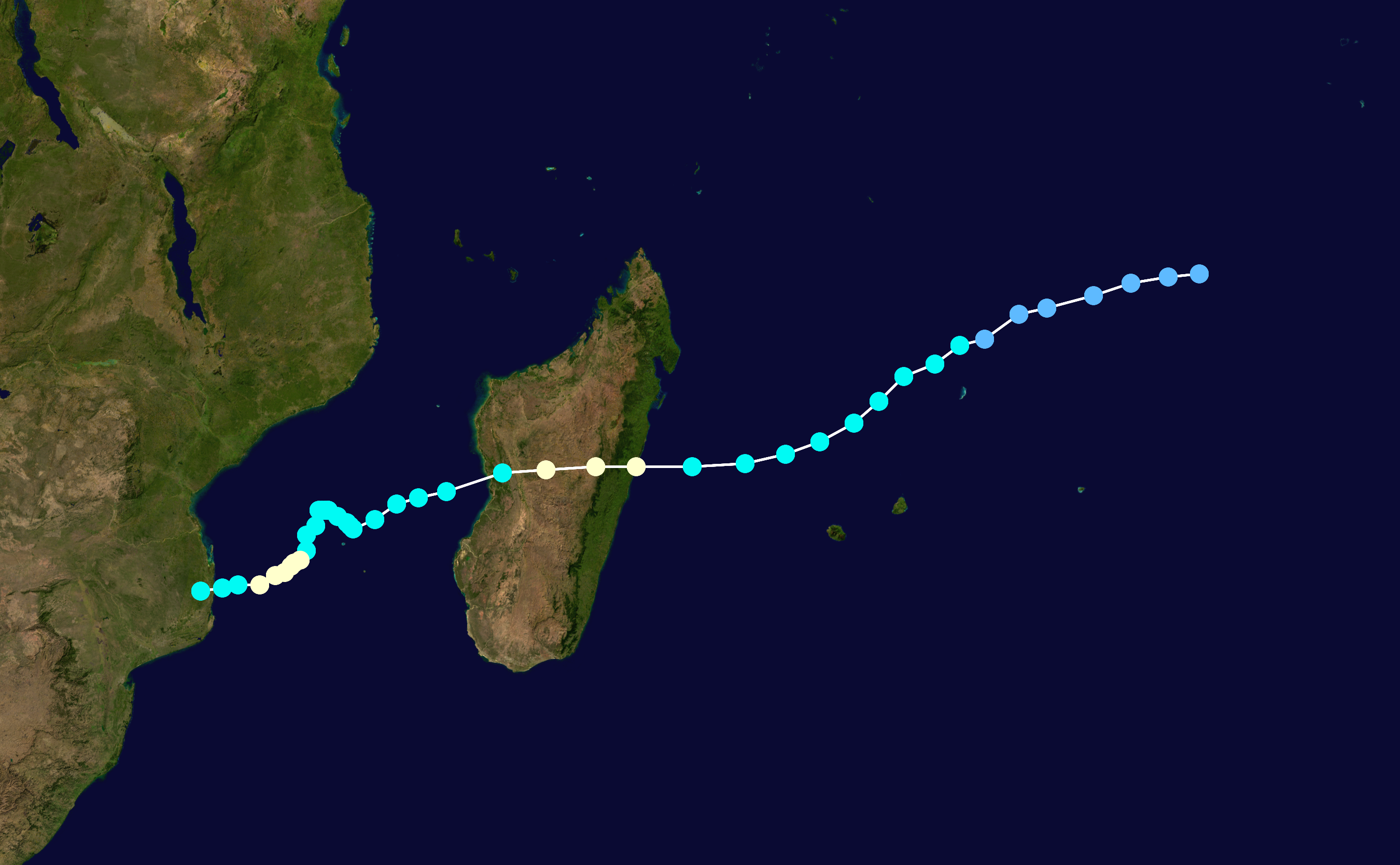
- Duration: February 10 – February 21
- Peak intensity: 120 km/h (75 mph) (10-min);

Rainfall from the storm spread from Swaziland to Durban in South Africa, reaching over 350 mm (14 in) near the coast. The rains caused widespread river flooding.

=== Intense Tropical Cyclone Fabienne ===
- Intense tropical cyclone (MFR)
- Category 4 tropical cyclone (SSHWS)
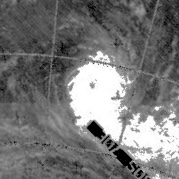
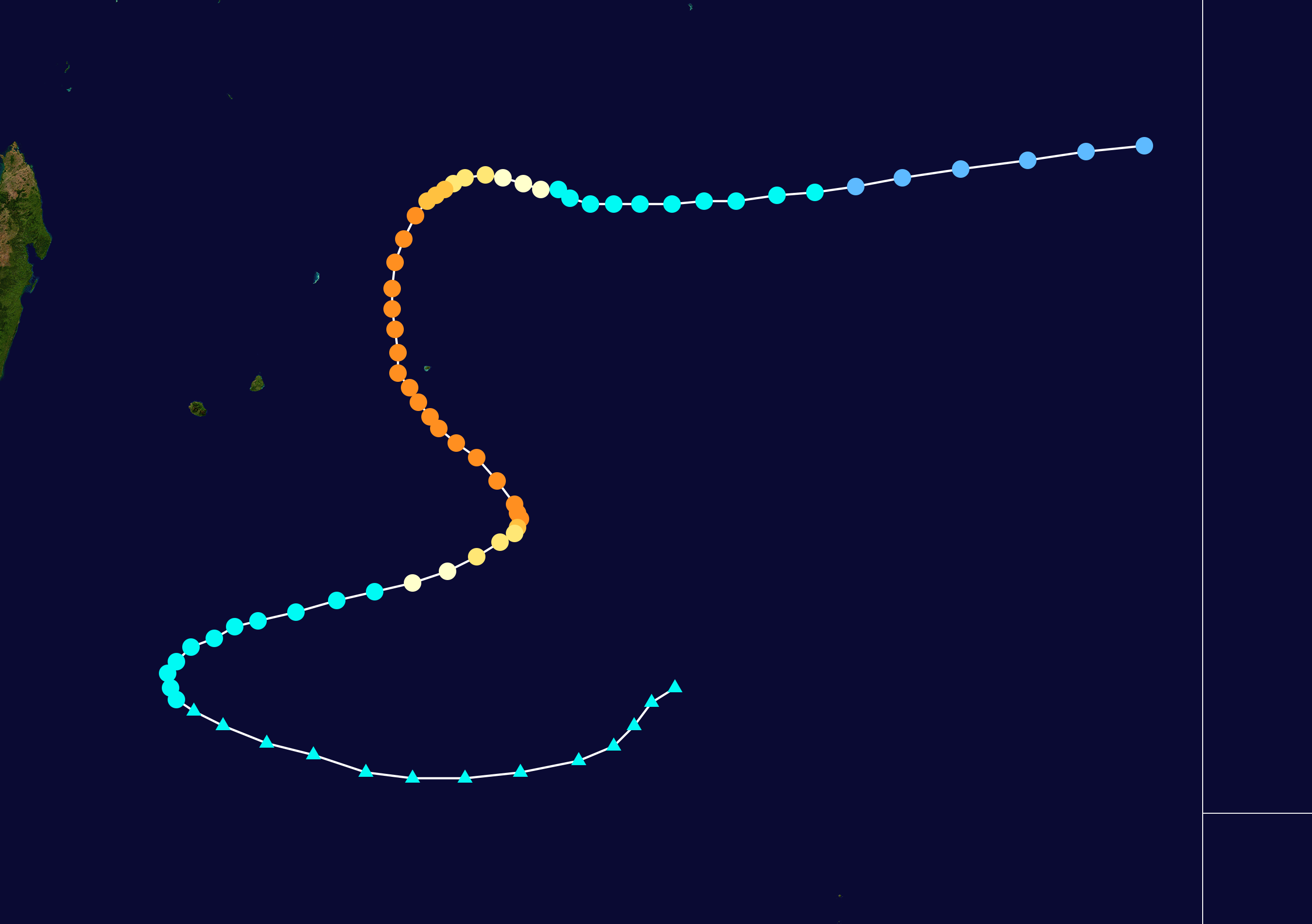
- Duration: February 11 – February 25
- Peak intensity: 215 km/h (130 mph) (10-min); 967 hPa (mbar)

Fabienne existed from February 11 to February 25. On February 18, Fabienne passed just west of Rodrigues, producing wind gusts of 254 km/h (158 mph). The storm caused two fatalities on the island, as well as 16 injuries.

=== Tropical Cyclone Tessie–Gigi ===
- Tropical cyclone (MFR)
- Tropical storm (SSHWS)
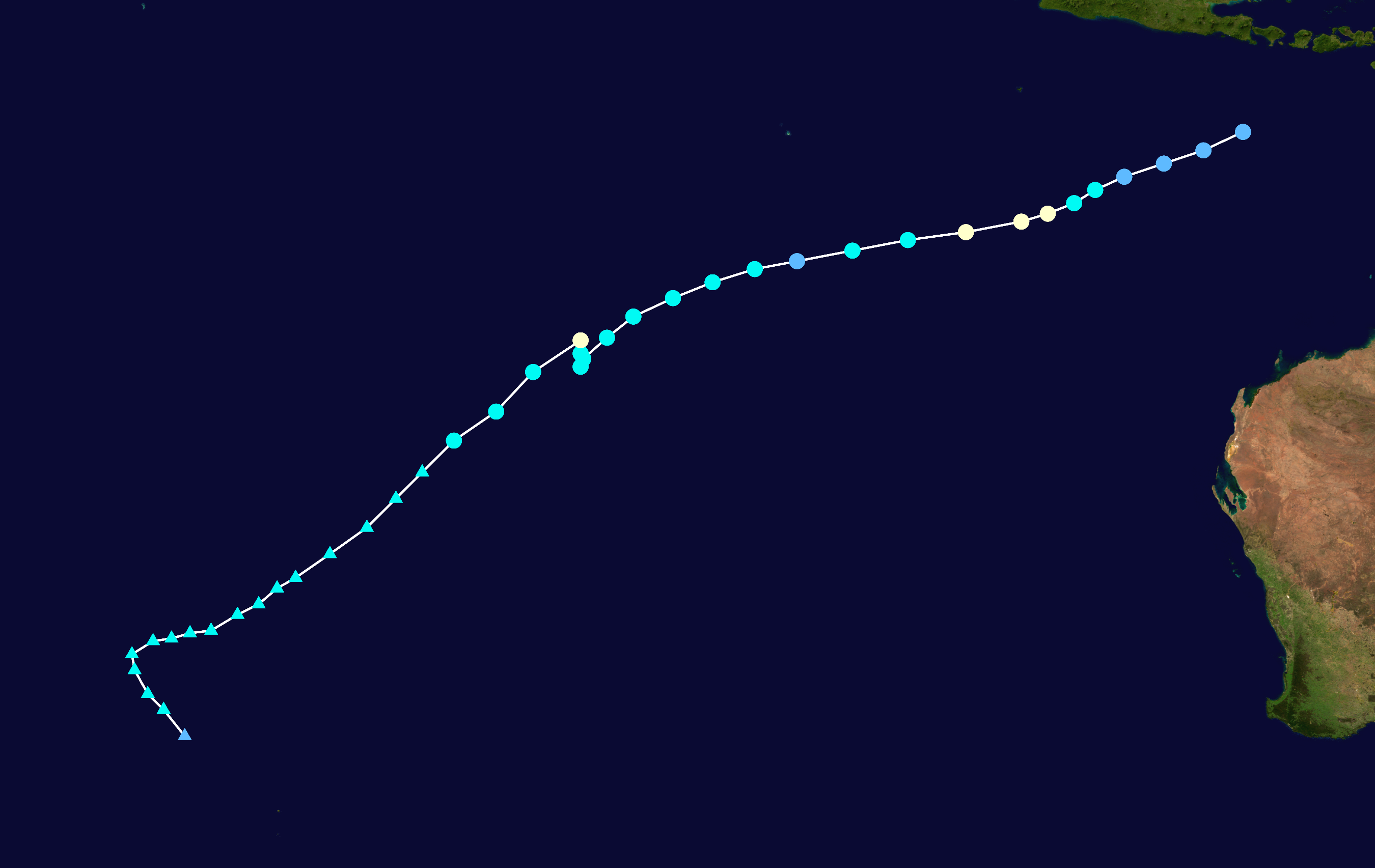
- Duration: February 27 (Entered basin) – February 28
- Peak intensity: 120 km/h (75 mph) (10-min);

This system entered the basin on February 27 and became extratropical by February 28.

=== Tropical Cyclone Hermione ===
- Tropical cyclone (MFR)
- Category 1 tropical cyclone (SSHWS)
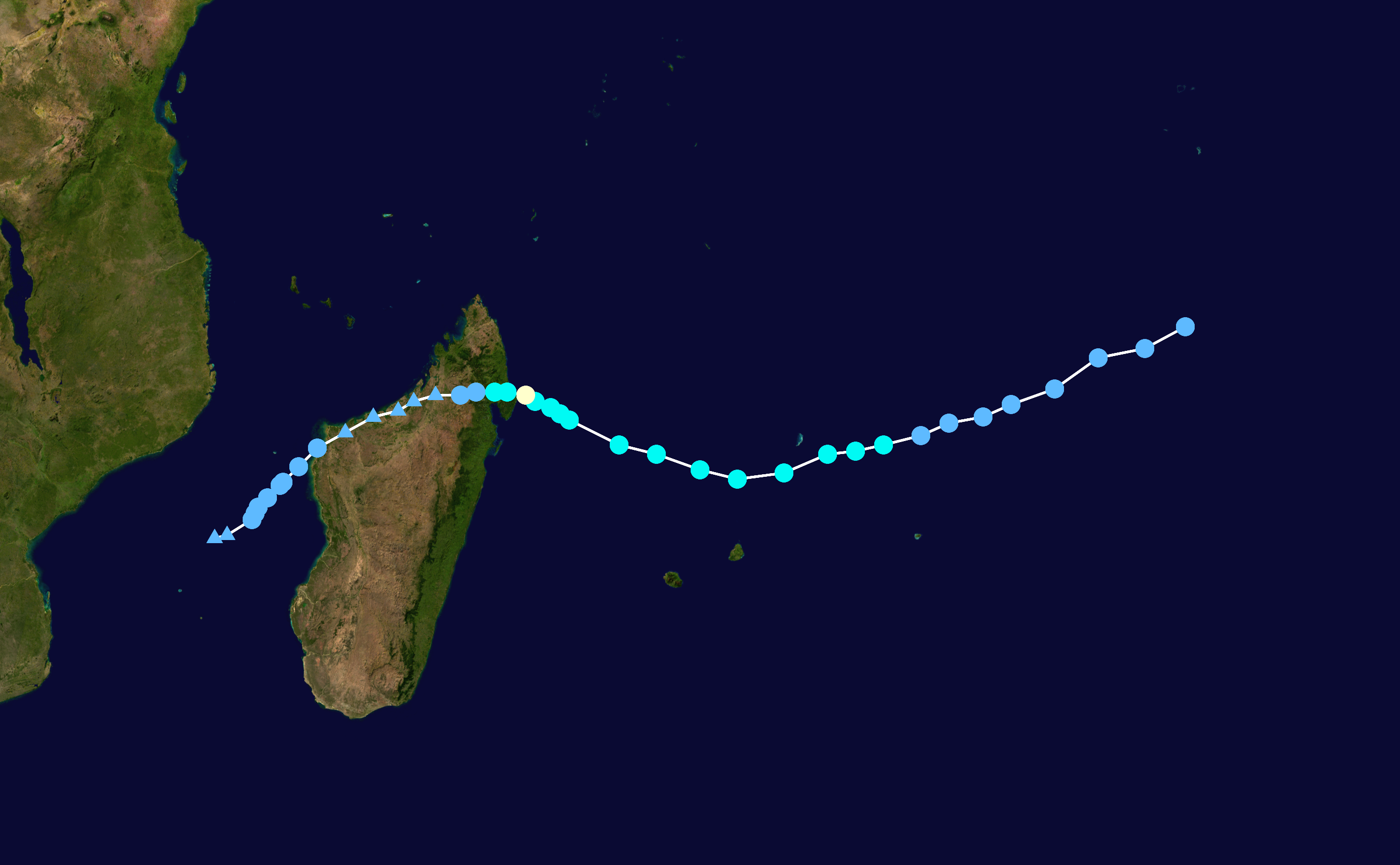
- Duration: March 1 – March 11
- Peak intensity: 120 km/h (75 mph) (10-min);

Hermione existed from March 1 to March 11. On March 5, Hermione passed north of the Mascarene Islands, producing heavy rainfall on Réunion that reached 757.5 mm (29.82 in) at Foc Foc.

== See also ==
- Atlantic hurricane seasons: 1971, 1972
- Eastern Pacific hurricane seasons: 1971, 1972
- Western Pacific typhoon seasons: 1971, 1972
- North Indian Ocean cyclone seasons: 1971, 1972
