= 1971 Atlantic hurricane season =

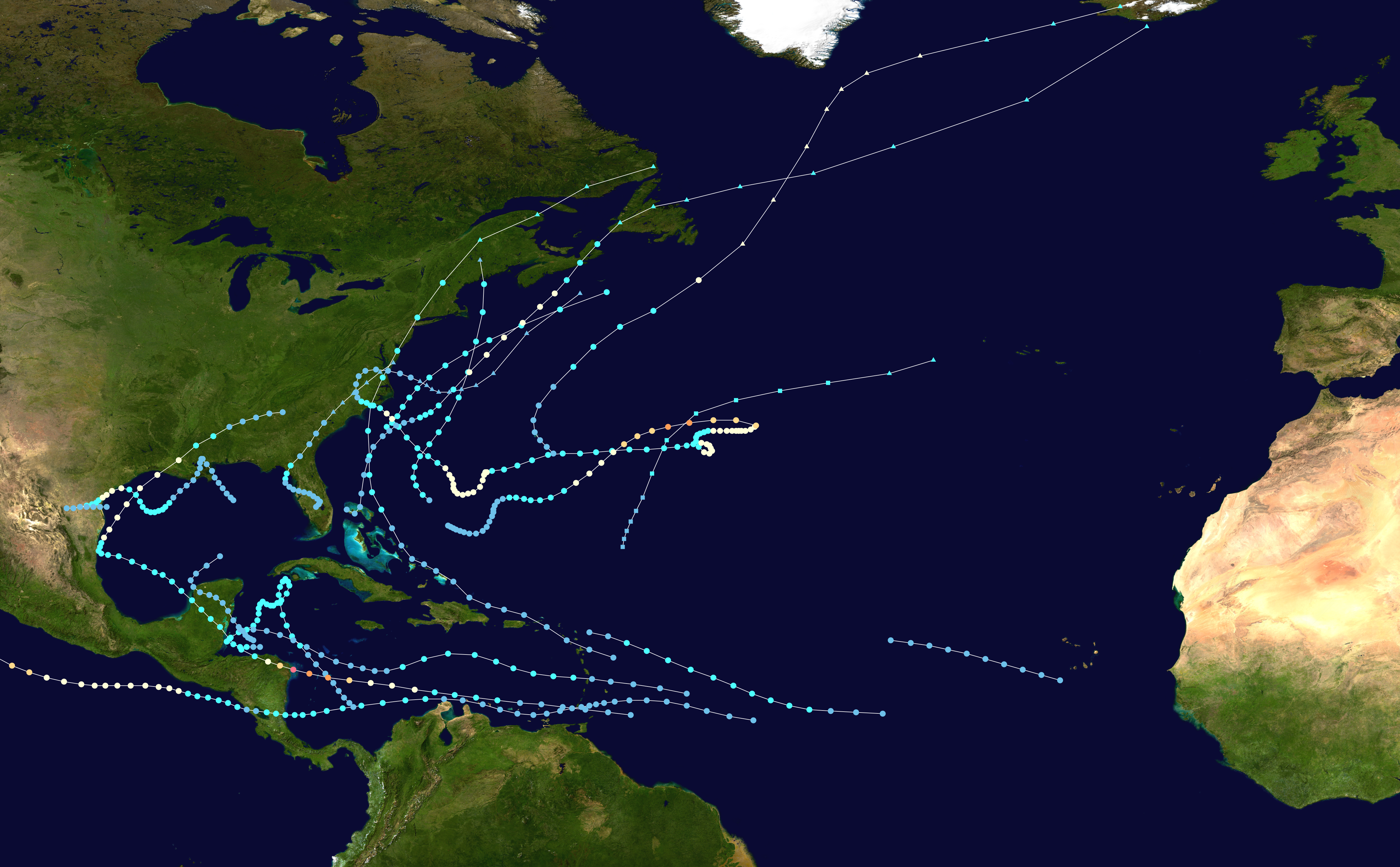
- Season summary map

Seasonal boundaries
- First system formed: July 4, 1971
- Last system dissipated: November 22, 1971

Strongest storm
- Name: Edith
  - Maximum winds: 150 mph (240 km/h) (1-minute sustained)
  - Lowest pressure: 943 mbar (hPa; 27.85 inHg)

Seasonal statistics
- Total depressions: 17
- Total storms: 14
- Hurricanes: 6
- Major hurricanes (Cat. 3+): 2
- Total fatalities: 52 total
- Total damage: $220 million (1971 USD)

Related articles
- 1971 Pacific hurricane season; 1971 Pacific typhoon season; 1971 North Indian Ocean cyclone season

The 1971 Atlantic hurricane season was an active Atlantic hurricane season overall, producing 14 named storms (including two nameable systems that went unnamed), of which 6 strengthened into hurricanes, and 2 further strengthened into major hurricanes. (Note: Hurricanes reaching Category 3 and higher—1-minute sustained winds higher than 110 miles per hour (178 km/h)—on the Saffir–Simpson scale are described as major hurricanes.) The season officially began on June 1, 1971, and lasted until November 30, 1971. These dates conventionally delimit the period of each year when most tropical cyclones form in the Atlantic basin. This season, the first storm, Arlene, developed on July 4, while the last, Laura, dissipated on November 22.

Activity was steady through most of the season. Hurricane Edith was its strongest system, becoming a strong Category 4 on the Saffir–Simpson scale. It struck Nicaragua at peak intensity, killing dozens, and later hit southern Louisiana. Hurricane Ginger, the second of the season's two major hurricanes, was its longest-lived system, lasting 27 days from early September to early October, setting a record for the longest known duration of a North Atlantic tropical cyclone (not surpassed until 2003). Ginger moved ashore in North Carolina, producing heavy rains and damaging winds. An unnamed storm in August attained hurricane status further north than any other Atlantic hurricane on record. On September 11–13, there were five active Atlantic tropical cyclones at one time. Despite the activity, damage in the United States totaled about $235 million (1971 USD, 1.87 billion 2026 USD), which National Hurricane Center forecaster Paul Hebert noted was "pretty small considering we had five storms in a row strike the U.S." Most of the damage came from Tropical Storm Doria, which affected much of the East Coast of the United States. Hurricane Fern struck Texas after executing an unusual track, dropping heavy rainfall and producing flooding.

== Systems ==
=== Tropical Storm Arlene ===
- Tropical storm (SSHWS)
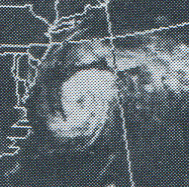
- Duration: July 4 – July 7
- Peak intensity: 60 mph (95 km/h) (1-min); 1000 mbar (hPa)

The origins of Arlene were from a cold front that exited the East Coast of the United States on July 2 and stalled offshore. A frontal wave developed the next day, steadily developing due to thermal instability. On July 4, the system organized into Tropical Storm Arlene about 125 mi (201 km) southeast of Cape Fear, North Carolina. While in its formative stages, it dropped rainfall along the coast of the Carolinas, peaking at 4.11 in (104 mm) in Pinopolis, South Carolina. Arlene tracked northeastward due to a ridge over New England, and the cyclone passed just southeast of the Outer Banks. In the post-season summary, meteorologist Neil Frank noted, "the surprising element in the development of Arlene was the rapidity of the transformation process."

Arlene continued northeastward, possessing a circular mass of convection with spiral rainbands. Late on July 6, the storm attained peak winds of 60 mph (95 km/h), based on a ship report. It weakened thereafter, and Arlene transitioned into an extratropical cyclone early on July 7 just south of Sable Island. The storm capsized a boat in the Grand Banks of Newfoundland, and the crew of 12 was rescued.

=== Unnamed hurricane ===
- Category 1 hurricane (SSHWS)
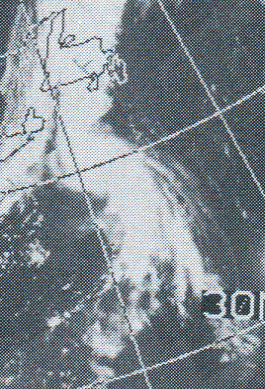
- Duration: August 3 – August 6
- Peak intensity: 80 mph (130 km/h) (1-min); ≤974 mbar (hPa)

A hybrid-type depression formed east of Bermuda on July 29. It moved rapidly southwestward before turning to a northwest drift. On August 3, it was classified as a tropical depression, and the next day the system passed near Bermuda. The depression accelerated to the northeast, strengthening into a tropical storm on August 5. It intensified further due to baroclinity, or enhanced instability through different levels of the atmosphere caused by temperature and moisture gradients. On August 6, a drilling rig about 230 mi (370 km) southeast of Newfoundland recorded sustained winds of 90 mph (140 km/h) with gusts to 126 mph (204 km/h) at an altitude of 325 ft (99 m); this suggested the storm attained hurricane status at 44°North, which is the northernmost location for a tropical storm to intensify into a hurricane.

Despite the intensity, the cyclone was not purely tropical; although the radius of maximum winds was only 35 mi (56 km), the thermal structure did not resemble a tropical cyclone, and there was no precipitation or convection near the center. It continued northeastward as a strong extratropical cyclone and meandered across the far northern Atlantic. It was not named operationally, but it was later added to the Atlantic hurricane database.

=== Hurricane Beth ===
- Category 1 hurricane (SSHWS)
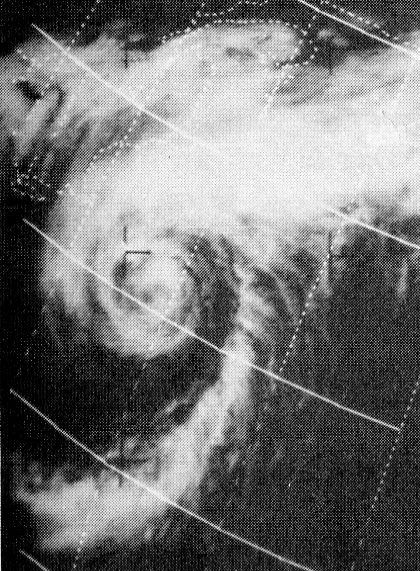
- Duration: August 10 – August 17
- Peak intensity: 85 mph (140 km/h) (1-min); 977 mbar (hPa)

On August 9, an upper-level low developed off the coast of Florida, and the next day spawned a tropical depression near Grand Bahama. After briefly moving southeastward across the island, the newly developed cyclone tracked slowly northeastward, eventually encountering conditions favorable for development. Late on August 13, the depression intensified into Tropical Storm Beth off the coast of North Carolina, and it quickly strengthened into a hurricane by August 15. After reaching peak winds of 85 mph (137 km/h) off the coast of Cape Cod, Beth slightly weakened and later moved ashore near Copper Lake, Nova Scotia as a strong tropical storm. Shortly thereafter, Beth was swept up by a nearby cold front and transitioned into an extratropical cyclone.

The hurricane left extensive damage in its wake, especially to crops and infrastructure. Halifax International Airport reported 10.49 in (266 mm) of rainfall in a 30‑hour span, which caused widespread flooding. Several bridges in the region were washed out, while railways were covered by water, forcing trains to suspend their operation. Overall monetary damage from Beth is estimated up to $5.1 million (1971 USD, 40.5 million 2026 USD). One person was indirectly killed by the hurricane in a traffic accident induced by heavy rainfall.

=== Tropical Storm Seven ===
- Tropical storm (SSHWS)
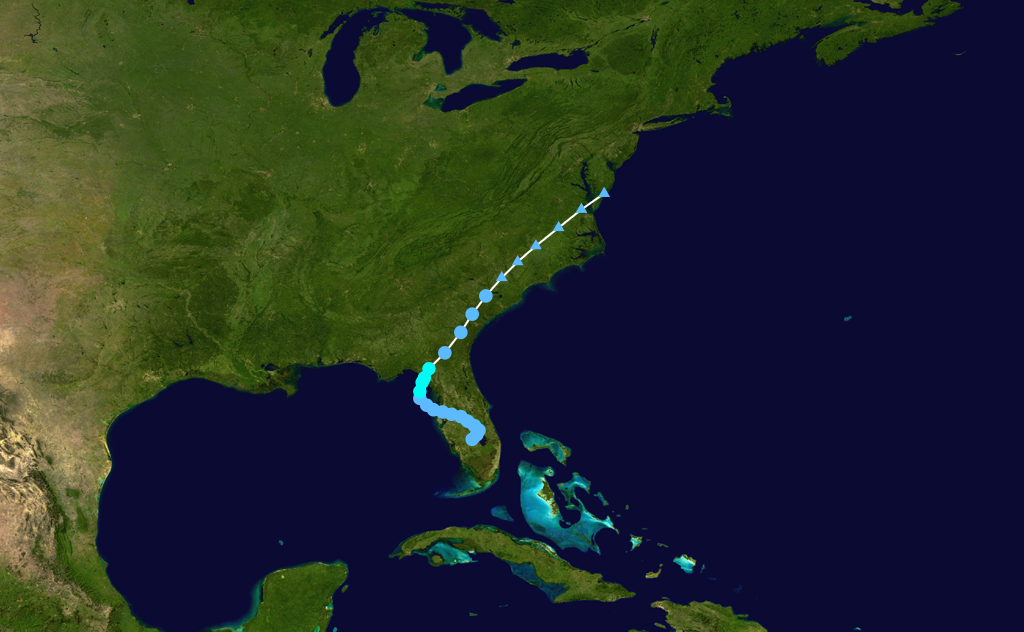
- Duration: August 13 – August 17
- Peak intensity: 45 mph (75 km/h) (1-min); 1002 mbar (hPa)

On August 12, a tropical depression developed off the coast of Florida. It quickly moved ashore after strengthening to a tropical storm, reaching Lake Okeechobee before looping to the northwest. While moving across the state, it dropped heavy rainfall of around 10 in (250 mm) along the west coast. In Pinellas Park, the heavy rains led to flash flooding that forced 200 families from their house, including one that required evacuation from a helicopter. Damage in the region was estimated at $250,000 (1971 USD, 1.99 million 2026 USD).

The depression emerged into the Gulf of Mexico on August 15 near Tampa, and later turned to the northeast ahead of an upper-level low. The depression remained weak as it meandered off the Southeast coast and dissipating on August 17 near the Delmarva Peninsula. In South Carolina, it produced its heaviest rainfall, totaling 14.11 in (358 mm) in Sullivan's Island. In nearby Savannah, Georgia, the rainfall forced about 100 families from their houses in low-lying areas. The remnants continued northeastward through the Mid-Atlantic States and New England, crossing into Canada on August 20.

=== Tropical Storm Chloe ===
- Tropical storm (SSHWS)
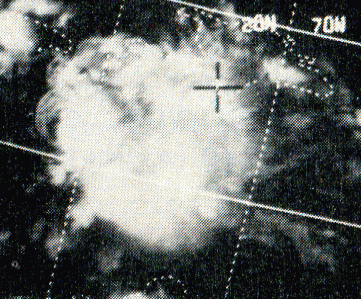
- Duration: August 18 – August 24
- Peak intensity: 60 mph (95 km/h) (1-min); 1002 mbar (hPa)

A tropical wave moved off the coast of Africa on August 13, moving westward for several days before organizing into a tropical depression on August 18 about 400 mi (640 km) east of Barbados. It quickly moved through the Lesser Antilles, where it produced wind gusts up to 58 mph (93 km/h). The cyclone also dropped heavy rainfall up to 6 in (150 mm) on Barbados and Martinique. After entering the eastern Caribbean Sea, the depression intensified into Tropical Storm Chloe on August 20. About 18 hours after attaining tropical storm status, Chloe quickly strengthened to peak winds of 60 mph (97 km/h) about 215 mi (345 km) south of the Mona Passage, as reported by reconnaissance aircraft.

After reaching peak intensity, Chloe began weakening as it turned to the west-southwest, and late on August 22, it was downgraded to a tropical depression as a weakening ridge to its north cut off the low-level inflow. For several days it continued generally westward, gradually losing organization. While passing south of Jamaica, the storm prompted the evacuation of the SS Hope, a hospital ship, at Kingston. Late on August 24, Chloe dissipated about 65 mi (105 km) east of San Pedro Town, Belize. The remnants of Chloe later spawned Hurricane Lily in the eastern Pacific Ocean.

=== Tropical Storm Doria ===
- Tropical storm (SSHWS)
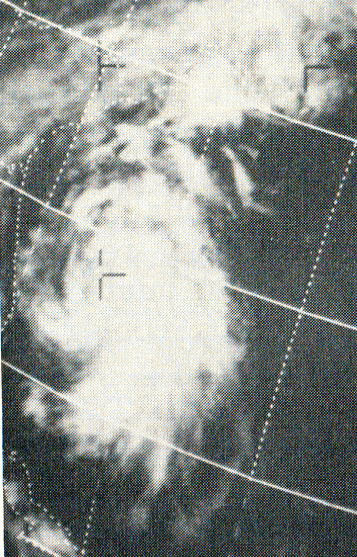
- Duration: August 23 – August 28
- Peak intensity: 70 mph (110 km/h) (1-min); 989 mbar (hPa)

Tropical Storm Doria, the costliest storm of the season, developed from a tropical wave on August 23 to the east of the Lesser Antilles, and after about three days without development attained tropical storm status to the east of the Abaco Islands in the Bahamas. Doria turned to the north, and reached peak winds of 70 mph (110 km/h) as it was making landfall near Morehead City, North Carolina. It turned to the northeast hugging the coast and holding its intensity as it passed the North Carolina and Virginia coasts (although it may have briefly become a hurricane - the data was inconclusive), and moved through the Mid-Atlantic and New England as a tropical storm before becoming an extratropical storm over Maine on August 28.

In North Carolina, Doria produced moderate rainfall, resulting in localized flooding and damage. The storm spawned a tornado near Norfolk, Virginia, damaging twelve houses and downing hundreds of trees. Tropical Storm Doria dropped heavy precipitation in New Jersey, peaking at 10.29 in (261 mm) in Little Falls. The rainfall led to record-breaking river levels and flooding in several houses, resulting in damage to dozens of houses across the state. Moderate damage and rainfall continued along its path into New England and southeastern Canada. In all, Tropical Storm Doria caused seven deaths and $147.6 million (1971 USD, 1.17 billion 2026 USD).

=== Hurricane Fern ===
- Category 1 hurricane (SSHWS)
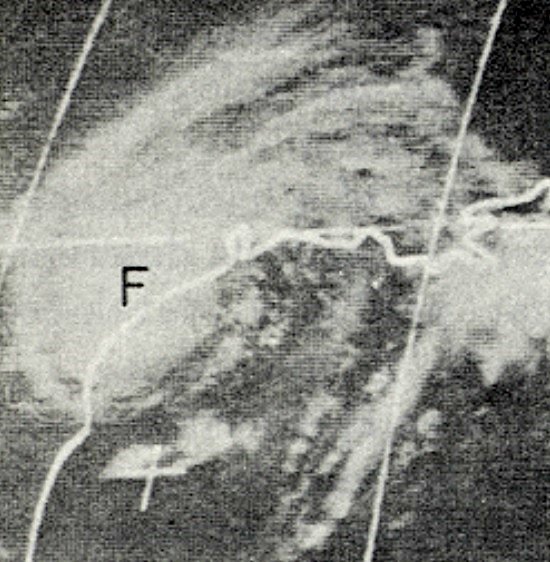
- Duration: September 3 – September 13
- Peak intensity: 85 mph (140 km/h) (1-min); 978 mbar (hPa)

Hurricane Fern was the first of four tropical systems to develop in association with an extended surface trough across the Gulf of Mexico into the open Atlantic, along with Ginger, Heidi, and a strong tropical depression. Fern developed on September 3 in the central Gulf of Mexico. It moved very close to southern Louisiana the next day, but due to increased ridging to the north the depression moved southwestward and remained over water. On September 7, the depression intensified into Tropical Storm Fern. Fern later turned to the northwest, intensifying into a hurricane on September 10. It quickly reached peak winds of 85 mph (137 km/h), moving ashore early on September 11 between Freeport and Matagorda, Texas as a tropical storm. Fern dissipated on September 13 over northeastern Mexico.

The precursor of Fern dropped rainfall up to 5 in (130 mm) of rainfall across South Florida, while totals of up to 10 in (250 mm) were reported in southeastern Louisiana where it made its first landfall. As it struck Texas, Fern produced strong winds up to 86 mph (138 km/h), along with 5 to 6 ft (1.5 to 1.8 m) storm tides and heavy rainfall; the highest precipitation total was 26.0 in (660 mm) in Beeville. The heavy rainfall caused severe flash flooding that isolated numerous small towns in the southeastern portion of the state, damaging 7,500 buildings. In all, Fern left two indirect deaths and moderate damage totaling $30.2 million (1971 USD, 232 million 2026 USD).

=== Hurricane Edith ===
- Category 4 hurricane (SSHWS)
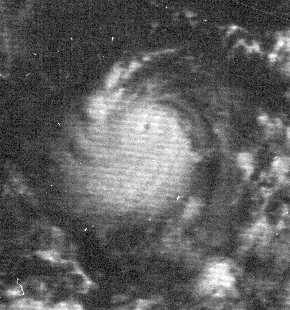
- Duration: September 5 – September 18
- Peak intensity: 150 mph (240 km/h) (1-min); 943 mbar (hPa)

Hurricane Edith, the strongest storm of the season, developed from a tropical wave on September 5 to the east of the southern Lesser Antilles. It moved quickly across the southern Caribbean Sea, intensifying into a hurricane just off the north coast of South America. Edith rapidly intensified on September 9 and made landfall on Cape Gracias a Dios as a strong Category 4 hurricane on the Saffir-Simpson Hurricane Scale. It quickly lost intensity over Central America and after briefly entering the Gulf of Honduras it crossed the Yucatán Peninsula in Mexico. After moving across the Gulf of Mexico, a trough turned the storm to the northeast and Edith, after having restrengthened while accelerating towards the coast, made landfall on Louisiana with winds of 90 mph (150 km/h) on September 16. Edith steadily weakened over land and dissipated over Georgia on September 18.

The hurricane killed two people when it passed near Aruba. Striking northeastern Central America as a strong Category 4 hurricane, Edith destroyed hundreds of homes and killed at least 35 people. In Texas high tides caused coastal flooding but little damage. Edith caused moderate to heavy damage in portions of Louisiana due to flooding and a tornado outbreak from the storm. One tornado, rated F3 on the Fujita Scale, damaged several homes and injured multiple people in Baton Rouge. The tornado outbreak extended eastward into Florida. Damage in the United States totaled $25 million (1971 USD, 199 million 2026 USD).

=== Hurricane Ginger ===
- Category 3 hurricane (SSHWS)
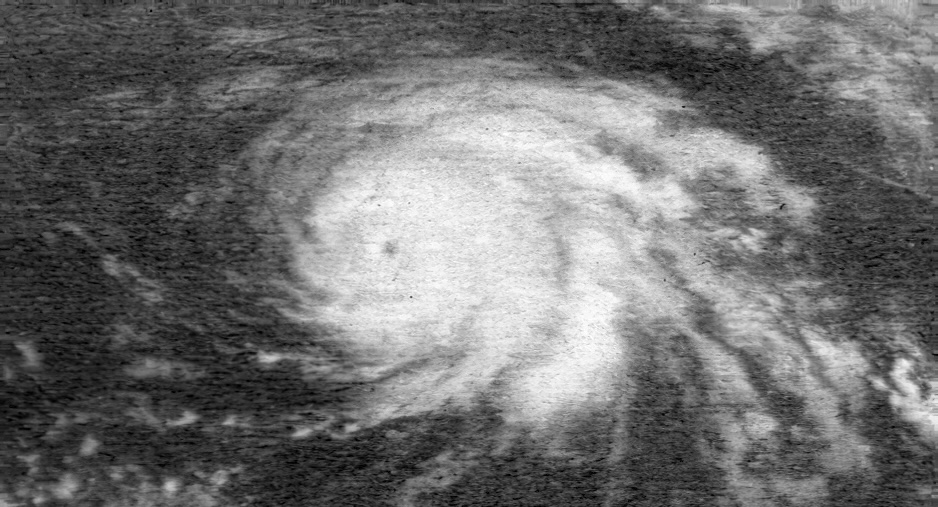
- Duration: September 6 – October 3
- Peak intensity: 115 mph (185 km/h) (1-min); 959 mbar (hPa)

Hurricane Ginger was thought to be the longest lasting Atlantic hurricane on record until 2003, when the 1899 San Ciriaco hurricane was retroactively found to have lasted longer. The eighth tropical cyclone and fifth hurricane of the season, Ginger spent over 27 days as a tropical cyclone, and lasted from September 6 to October 3. The storm developed in a large region of convection across the Gulf of Mexico and western Atlantic, and for the first nine days of its duration tracked generally east- or northeastward while gradually strengthening to peak winds of 115 mph (185 km/h). On September 14 Ginger slowed and turned to a general westward track. The cyclone then fluctuated in intensity over the course of several days between hurricane status and tropical storm intensity. Ginger passed near Bermuda on September 23; there, the storm produced gusty winds and high waves, but no damage.

While over the western Atlantic Ocean, Ginger became the last target of Project Stormfury, which sought to weaken hurricanes by depositing silver iodide into tropical cyclone rainbands. The plane dropped silver iodide into the center of Ginger, although there was no effect due to Ginger's large eye and diffuse nature; Ginger was the last seeding done by the project. Ginger ultimately struck North Carolina on September 30 as strong tropical storm, lashing the coastline with gusty winds that caused power outages across the region. Heavy rainfall flooded towns and left heavy crop damage, with 3 million bushels of corn and 1 million bushels of soybean lost. Damage in the state was estimated at $10 million (1971 USD, 79.5 million 2026 USD). Further north, moderate rainfall and winds spread through the Mid-Atlantic states, although no significant damage was reported outside of North Carolina. Early on October 3, Ginger reemerged into the Atlantic from Virginia's Delmarva Peninsula as a tropical depression and transitioned into an extratropical cyclone several hours later.

=== Tropical Storm Heidi ===
- Tropical storm (SSHWS)
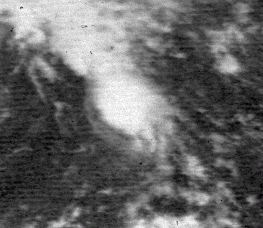
- Duration: September 11 – September 14
- Peak intensity: 60 mph (95 km/h) (1-min); 995 mbar (hPa)

Tropical Storm Heidi was the last of the four tropical systems to develop from the extended surface trough of low pressure, forming on September 11 northeast of the Bahamas and intensifying into a tropical storm about six hours later. After initially moving to the northwest, Heidi curved northeastward and attained its peak intensity of 60 mph (95 km/h) on September 14 off the coast of North Carolina. The storm failed to become a well-organized system, and it gradually weakened while accelerating north-northeastward. On September 15, shortly after Heidi moved ashore in Maine, it was absorbed by a broad extratropical cyclone over the northern Appalachians.

Heidi did not directly cause any fatalities or severe damage. However, the larger extratropical storm drew in moisture from Heidi, producing rainfall from North Carolina through northern New England, including a peak of 9.38 in (238 mm) in southeastern Pennsylvania. The heavy rains triggered extensive flooding that caused over a dozen fatalities and left thousands of residents homeless in Pennsylvania and New Jersey. In Chester, Pennsylvania, a stone dam collapsed, forcing hundreds of families to evacuate and damaging homes, businesses, roads, and bridges. Governor Milton Shapp declared a state of emergency in several Pennsylvania counties following the floods.

=== Hurricane Irene ===
- Category 1 hurricane (SSHWS)
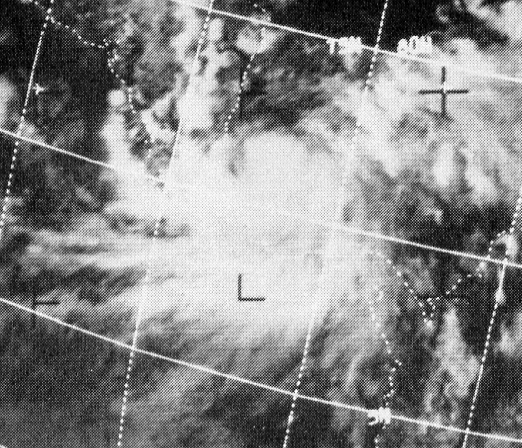
- Duration: September 11 – September 20 (Exited basin)
- Peak intensity: 75 mph (120 km/h) (1-min); 989 mbar (hPa)

A tropical wave spawned a tropical depression on September 11 about 800 mi (1300 km) east of the Windward Islands. The cyclone tracked nearly due westward at a low latitude, passing through the southern Windward Islands and later over northern South America. In the southwest Caribbean Sea, it intensified to a tropical storm on September 17. Irene made landfall on southeastern Nicaragua on September 19 as a minimal hurricane, and maintained its circulation while crossing the low-lying terrain of the country. Restrengthening after reaching the Pacific, Irene was renamed Hurricane Olivia, which ultimately attained peak winds of 115 mph (185 km/h) before weakening and dissipating over northwestern Mexico.

In the Atlantic, Irene produced moderate rainfall and winds along its path, although impact was greatest in Nicaragua where it moved ashore as a hurricane. A total of 96 homes were destroyed, and 1,200 people were left homeless. The rainfall resulted in widespread flooding, killing three people in Rivas. In neighboring Costa Rica, Hurricane Irene caused more than $1 million (1971 USD, 7.95 million 2026 USD) in damage to the banana crop. The hurricane was the first actively tracked tropical cyclone that moved into the eastern Pacific Ocean from the Atlantic Ocean.

=== Tropical Storm Janice ===
- Tropical storm (SSHWS)
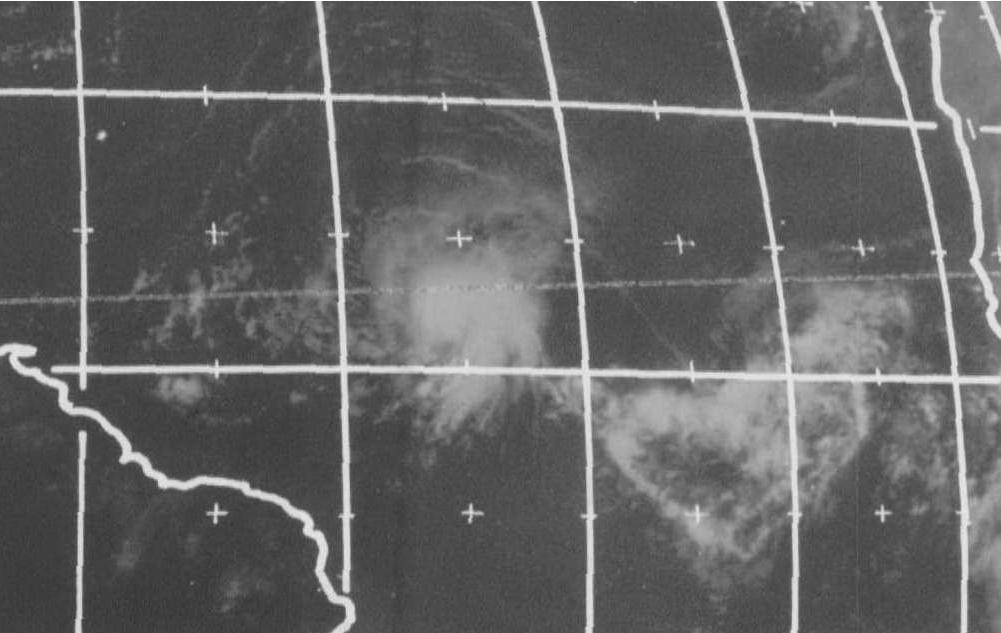
- Duration: September 21 – September 24
- Peak intensity: 50 mph (85 km/h) (1-min); 1005 mbar (hPa)

The origins of Janice were from a tropical wave that moved off the coast of Africa on September 18. It developed into a tropical depression on September 21 about 1050 mi (1700 km) west-southwest of Cape Verde, which was the easternmost formation of the named storms this season. The next day, the depression intensified into Tropical Storm Janice, and quickly reached peak winds of 50 mph (80 km/h). The storm never became well-organized, with its peak winds located east of the broad center. Despite being in a climatologically favored region for further development, Janice weakened due to increased wind shear from Hurricane Ginger. The circulation became elongated and separated from the convection, and on September 24 the storm weakened to a tropical depression. Later that day Janice dissipated just northeast of the Lesser Antilles as it was absorbed by Ginger. Around that time, it produced rainfall in the northeastern Caribbean, reaching 4 in (100 mm) on Saint Kitts; no damage or fatalities were reported.

=== Subtropical Storm Kristy ===
- Subtropical storm (SSHWS)
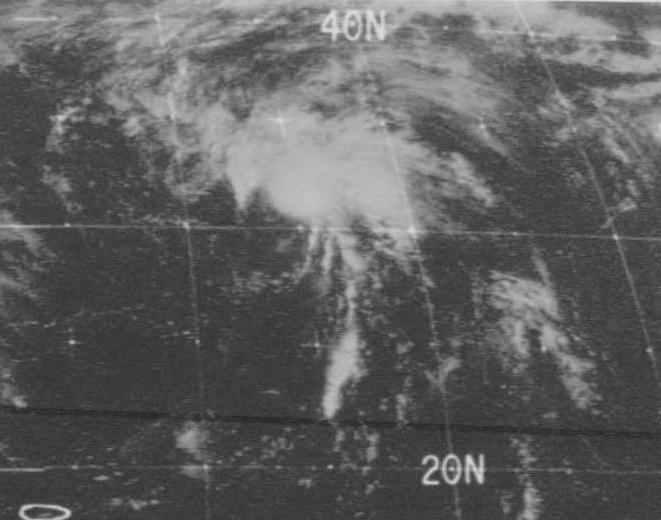
- Duration: October 18 – October 21
- Peak intensity: 70 mph (110 km/h) (1-min); 992 mbar (hPa)

The interaction between a tropical wave and an upper-level trough led to the development of a subtropical depression on October 18, about 685 mi (1100 km) northeast of Puerto Rico. It moved quickly north-northeastward, followed by a curve to the northeast. On October 20, a ship reported winds of 45 mph (72 km/h), indicating the depression intensified into Subtropical Storm Kristy. (Note: Subtropical storms were not named prior to 2002; Kristy was operationally considered tropical but reanalyzed in 2026.) As it reached this strength, an approaching cold front produced cooler, drier air over the storm. Kristy intensified slightly further to peak winds of 70 mph (110 km/h) before becoming indistinguishable from the cold front. By October 21 it transitioned into an extratropical cyclone before dissipating near the Azores.

=== Tropical Storm Laura ===
- Tropical storm (SSHWS)
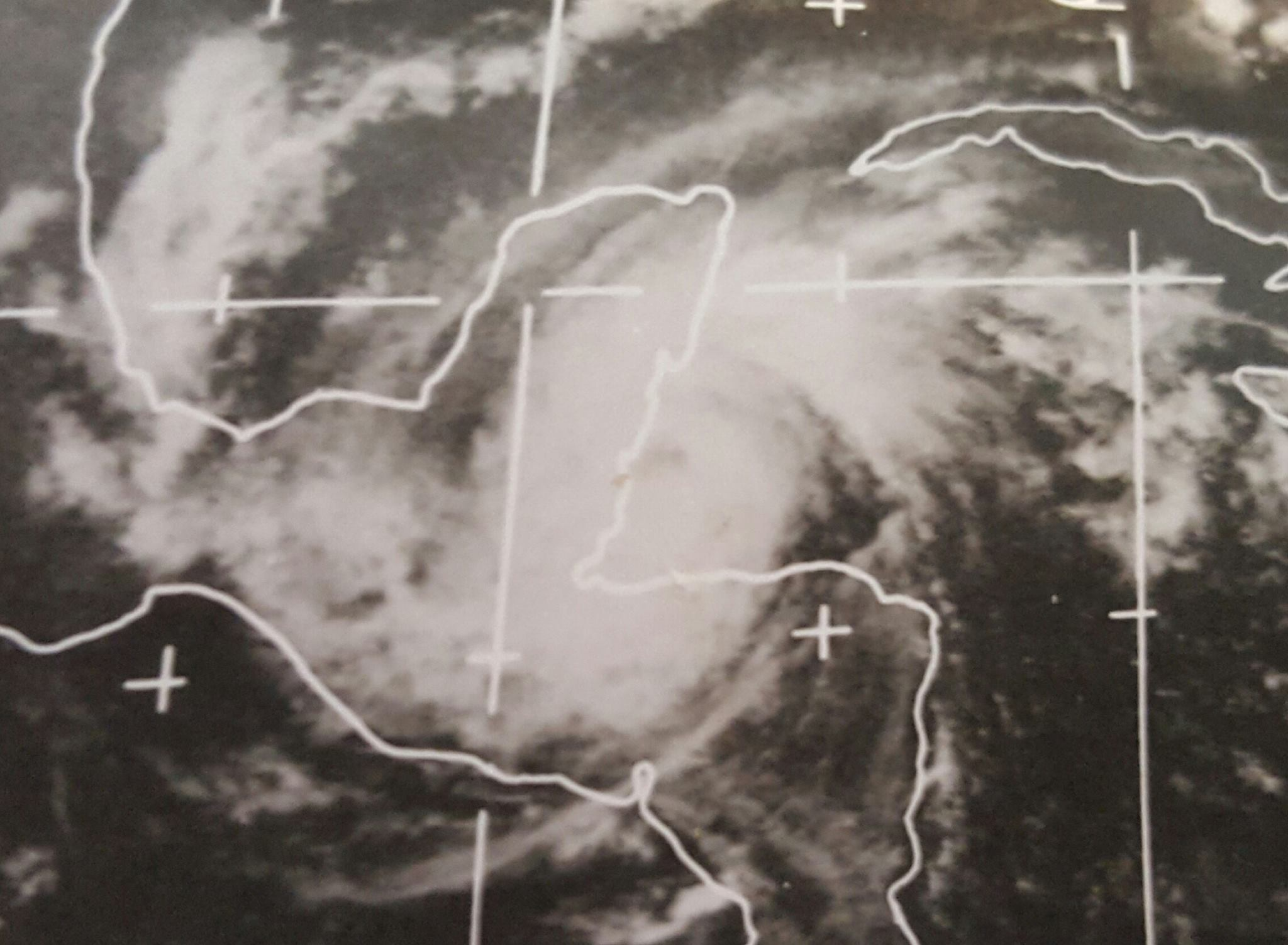
- Duration: November 12 – November 22
- Peak intensity: 70 mph (110 km/h) (1-min); 994 mbar (hPa)

A large area of convection persisted across the southwest Caribbean Sea in mid-November. On November 12, a tropical depression formed about 175 miles (282 km) north of Panama. It moved northwestward, slowly organizing and becoming Tropical Storm Laura on November 14. The storm continued to intensify as it turned northward toward western Cuba. Late on November 15, Laura attained peak winds of 70 mph (110 km/h). A ridge over the southeastern United States caused Laura to drift and execute a clockwise loop off the west coast of Cuba. By early on November 18, the storm was weakening and moving southwestward away from Cuba. The track shifted but continued generally to the southwest, as the intensity fluctuated from 50–70 mph (80–110 km/h), and due to the hints of an eye at times on radar, may have reached hurricane status during this period. On November 21, Laura made landfall at peak intensity near Punta Gorda, Belize. It dissipated the next day over Guatemala.

When Tropical Storm Laura first passed the Cayman Islands, it produced 3 inches (76 mm) of rainfall on Grand Cayman. As it was slowly moving off of the coast of Cuba, Laura dropped heavy rainfall, including nearly 20 inches (510 mm) across most of the Isle of Youth. The highest total in the country was 32.5 inches (830 mm), and overall the storm impacted four provinces, including Isle of Youth, Pinar del Río, La Habana, and the city of Havana. On the Isle of Youth, Laura produced winds of 70 mph (110 km/h), with gusts to 80 mph (130 km/h). On the mainland, the storm destroyed 20 homes and several tobacco sheds, with damage also reported to the coffee, sugar, fruit, and vegetable crops. Due to the flooding, officials forced 26,000 people from their homes in Pinar del Río, and one person in that province drowned while crossing a river. The storm's passage was believed to have diverted a flock of great black-backed gulls toward Central America and north-coastal South America; the species is usually found in the Mid-Atlantic states, and were migrating to the Gulf Coast or Cuba when they were affected by the storm. Heavy rainfall was reported across Central America. Laura was one of only four November storms to affect Belize. On Glover's Reef offshore, the storm stranded a group of about 20 scientists affiliated with the Smithsonian Institution who required rescue. The storm damaged several buildings on the Belize mainland.

=== Other systems ===
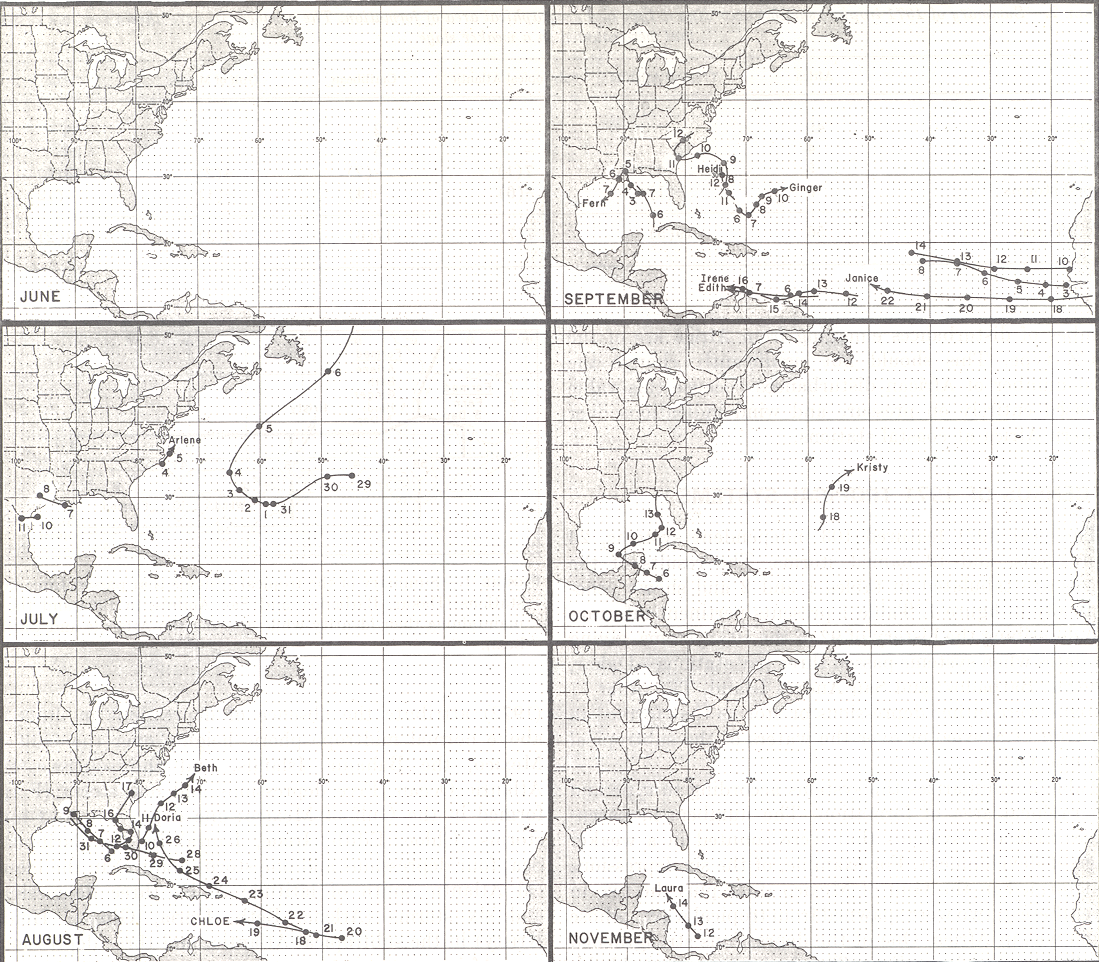
Tracks of all depressions during 1971. Note: a reanalysis project revised or removed some of these systems from HURDAT in 2026

In addition to the named storms and otherwise notable cyclones, there were several weak depressions during the season. After a June devoid of activity, three tropical depressions developed within the first ten days of July. The first became Tropical Storm Arlene on July 4. Another tropical depression formed in the northwestern Gulf of Mexico from a surface low-pressure area on July 9, quickly moving ashore in southern Texas before dissipating on July 11; it dropped light rainfall along its path.

Another non-developing tropical depression developed on September 5 near Cape Verde. It moved west-northwestwar before dissipating on September 7, although it may have briefly reached tropical storm intensity. The final non-developing tropical depression of the season formed on October 6 in the western Caribbean Sea. It crossed the Yucatán Peninsula the next day, dropping heavy rainfall up to 9.09 in (231 mm). The depression turned to the northeast due to an approaching upper-level trough, and it transitioned into a frontal wave on October 10. As the trough advanced ahead of the storm, a ridge built across the southeast United States, causing the cyclone to turn northward and parallel the west coast of Florida. It regained tropical characteristics before moving ashore near Apalachicola and dissipating on October 14.

Five systems originally classified as tropical depressions were removed from the official Atlantic hurricane database in 2026, which were previously believed to have existed from July 7 to July 9, August 6 to August 9, August 28 to September 1, September 8 to September 11, and September 10 to September 14. The July system, formerly known as Tropical Depression Two, dropped 3.90 in (99 mm) of rain near Carrabelle, Florida, while the late August and early September storm, then known as Tropical Depression Ten, produced up to 6.82 in (173 mm) of precipitation at Gulf Shores, Alabama.

== Storm names ==
The following list of names was used for named tropical storms that formed in the North Atlantic in 1971. This is the same list used in the 1967 season, with the exception of Beth, which replaced Beulah. Storms were named Beth, Kristy, and Laura for the first time in 1971. No names were retired following the season; however, an overhaul of the naming system in 1979 to include male names resulted in this list being discarded.

- Arlene
- Beth
- Chloe
- Doria
- Edith
- Fern
- Ginger
- Heidi
- Irene
- Janice
- Kristy
- Laura
- Margo (unused)
- Nona (unused)
- Orchid (unused)
- Portia (unused)
- Rachel (unused)
- Sandra (unused)
- Terese (unused)
- Verna (unused)
- Wallis (unused)

== Season effects ==
This is a table of all of the storms that formed in the 1971 Atlantic hurricane season. It includes their name, duration, peak classification and intensities, areas affected, damage, and death totals. Deaths in parentheses are additional and indirect (an example of an indirect death would be a traffic accident), but were still related to that storm. Damage and deaths include totals while the storm was extratropical, a wave, or a low, and all of the damage figures are in 1971 USD.

Saffir–Simpson scale
TD	TS	C1	C2	C3	C4	C5

1971 North Atlantic tropical cyclone season statistics
Storm name	Dates active	Storm category at peak intensity	Max 1-min wind mph (km/h)	Min. press. (mbar)	Areas affected	Damage (US$)	Deaths	Ref(s).
Arlene	July 4–7	Tropical storm	60 (95)	1000	The Carolinas, Newfoundland	Minimal	None	
Three	July 10–11	Tropical depression	30 (45)	Unknown	Louisiana, Texas	None	None	
Unnamed	August 3–6	Category 1 hurricane	80 (130)	≤974	None	None	None	
Beth	August 10–17	Category 1 hurricane	85 (140)	977	Bahamas, Florida, Nova Scotia, Newfoundland	$5.1 million	0 (1)	
Seven	August 13–17	Tropical storm	45 (75)	1002	Southeastern United States	$250,000	None	
Chloe	August 18–24	Tropical storm	60 (95)	1002	Leeward Islands, Belize	Minimal	None	
Doria	August 23–28	Tropical storm	70 (110)	989	East Coast of the United States, southeastern Canada	$148 million	7	
Fern	September 3–13	Category 1 hurricane	85 (140)	978	Louisiana, Texas, northern Mexico	$30.2 million	0 (2)	
Twelve	September 5–7	Tropical depression	35 (55)	Unknown	None	None	None	
Edith	September 5–18	Category 4 hurricane	150 (240)	943	Lesser Antilles, northern Venezuela, northern Mexico, Southern United States	$25.4 million	37	
Ginger	September 6 – October 3	Category 3 hurricane	115 (185)	959	The Bahamas, North Carolina	$10 million	1	
Heidi	September 11–14	Tropical storm	60 (95)	995	Northeastern United States	Minimal	None	
Irene	September 11–20	Category 1 hurricane	75 (120)	989	Windward Islands, northern Venezuela, Central America	>$1 million	3	
Janice	September 21–24	Tropical storm	50 (85)	1005	Northern Leeward Islands	None	None	
Twenty	October 6–14	Tropical depression	30 (45)	Unknown	Yucatán Peninsula, Florida	None	None	
Kristy	October 18–21	Subtropical storm	70 (110)	992	None	None	None	
Laura	November 12–22	Tropical storm	70 (110)	994	Cayman Islands, Cuba, Central America	Minimal	1	
Season aggregates
17 systems	July 4 – November 22		150 (240)	943		>$220 million	52	

== See also ==
- 1971 Pacific hurricane season
- 1971 Pacific typhoon season
- 1971 North Indian Ocean cyclone season
- Australian region cyclone seasons: 1970–71 1971–72
- South Pacific cyclone seasons: 1970–71 1971–72
- South-West Indian Ocean cyclone seasons: 1970–71 1971–72
