= List of named storms (F) =

Storms are named for historical reasons to avoid confusion when communicating with the public, as more than one storm can exist at a time. Names are drawn in order from predetermined lists. For tropical cyclones, names are assigned when a system has one-, three-, or ten-minute winds of more than 65 km/h (40 mph). Standards, however, vary from basin to basin. For example, some tropical depressions are named in the Western Pacific, while within the Australian and Southern Pacific regions, the naming of tropical cyclones are delayed until they have gale-force winds occurring more than halfway around the storm center.

This list covers the letter F.

== Storms ==
Note: † indicates the name was retired after that usage in the respective basin

- Fabian

- 1981 – struck Cam Ranh Bay, Vietnam.
- 1985 (January) – passed near the Yap Main Islands.
- 1985 (September) – threatened no land.
- 1988 – did not impact land.
- 1991 – struck the Isle of Youth and mainland Cuba.
- 1997 – remained over the open ocean.
- 2003† – Category 4 hurricane, caused $300 million damage and four deaths after passing directly over Bermuda.
- 2013 – brought minor damage in China and Vietnam.
- 2017 – struck Hong Kong and Shenzhen.
- 2021 – made landfalls in the Putuo District of Zhoushan and Pinghu, China.
- 2025 – a tropical depression that made landfall in Philippines.

- Fabien (2023) – a powerful tropical cyclone is the strongest cyclone of this intensity in the satellite era, surpassing Cyclone Billy–Lila in 1986 by 6 days.
- Fabienne (1972) – A powerful tropical cyclone passed west of Rodriguez, killing two people on the island and injuring 16 people.
- Fabio

- 1982 – a Category 1 hurricane that stayed away from land.
- 1988 – a Category 4 hurricane that passed south of Hawaii but did not affect land.
- 1994 – a weak and short lived storm that did not affect land.
- 2000 – a weak storm that did not affect land.
- 2006 – a short lived storm that did not affect land while tropical, but its remnants affected Hawaii.
- 2012 – a Category 2 hurricane that did not affect land while tropical, but its remnants affected Baja California.
- 2018 – a Category 2 hurricane that became the earliest sixth named storm in the Eastern Pacific on record, never affected land.
- 2024 – a short lived storm that stayed far from land, its remnants were absorbed by nearby Tropical Storm Emilia.

- Faida (2025) – a weak tropical depression that affected in the Réunion and Madagascar.
- Faith

- 1947 – a strong tropical storm minimal affected Taiwan and Japan.
- 1966 – a long-lived Cape Verde hurricane that had impacts from the Lesser Antilles to Scandinavia
- 1972 – a Category 1 tropical cyclone that affected Queensland and Papua New Guinea.
- 1998 – struck both the Philippines and Vietnam during December 1998.

- Fakir (2018) – a short-lived yet damaging tropical cyclone that affected Réunion and Mauritius.
- Falcon

- 2003 – a tropical depression that was only recognized by PAGASA.
- 2007 – struck South Korea.
- 2011 – approached Korea.
- 2015 – powerful and long-lived cyclone, passed between Okinawa and Miyako-jima.
- 2019 – a tropical storm that passed along the coasts of the Philippines, Taiwan and China and hit South Korea.
- 2023 – a category 4 typhoon which lingered the Okinawa Islands, and eventually struck Korea.

- Fanele (2009) – the first cyclone of tropical cyclone status to strike western Madagascar since Cyclone Fame one year prior.
- Fani (2019) – extremely tropical cyclone to strike the Indian state of Odisha since the 1999 Odisha cyclone.
- Fanny

- 1963 – a strong tropical storm mostly stayed at sea.
- 1969 – a strong tropical cyclone.
- 1970 – a strong tropical cyclone that impacted Vanuatu and New Caledonia.

- Fanoos (2005) – was the fifth storm to affect southern India in six weeks.
- Fantala (2016) – the most intense tropical cyclone recorded in the South-West Indian Ocean in terms of sustained winds.
- Faraji (2020) – a Category 5 tropical cyclone mostly stayed at sea.
- Farida (1992) – a Category 4 tropical cyclone mostly stayed at sea.
- Faustine (1973) – a weak, short-lived tropical storm that remained at sea.
- Fausto

- 1984 – a Category 2 hurricane that passed near Southern California.
- 1990 – a Category 1 hurricane mostly stayed at sea.
- 1996 – made landfall on southern Baja California
- 2002 – regenerated into a tropical storm well north of the Hawaiian islands
- 2008 – ran parallel to the Mexican Rivera
- 2014 – never threatened land
- 2020 – remnants brought severe storms in California, killing one.
- 2026 – a Category 2 hurricane that passed near Hawaii.

- Favio (2007) – the first known tropical cyclone that passed south of Madagascar to strike Africa as an intense tropical cyclone.
- Faxai

- 2001 – a Category 5 typhoon mostly stayed at sea.
- 2007 – a short-lived tropical storm that had minor effects on land.
- 2014 – had no effects on land.
- 2019† – A Category 4 typhoon that made landfall in the Kantō region of Japan.

- Fay

- 1978† – affected Fiji.
- 2002 – a tropical storm that caused minor damage in Texas and northern Mexico.
- 2004† – a Category 5 storm that made landfall in Western Australia.
- 2008 – a near hurricane strength tropical storm that made landfall in Florida four times, the first known storm in history to do so.
- 2014 – a Category 1 hurricane that affected Bermuda.
- 2020 – a moderate tropical storm that affected New Jersey, earliest sixth named storm in the Atlantic basin.
- 2026 – a powerful tropical storm that stayed away from land.

- Faye

- 1949 – a category 2 typhoon impact Japan.
- 1952 – a weak tropical storm impact Philippines.
- 1957 – a powerful category 5 typhoon not make landfall.
- 1960 – a Category 4 typhoon passes off the coast of Japan.
- 1963 – a Category 3 typhoon struck Hong Kong killing 3 people.
- 1965 – did not make landfall.
- 1968 – a powerful 5 category typhoon not make landfall.
- 1971 – a powerful tropical storm impact Philippines.
- 1974 – a powerful tropical storm hit the Philippines and Thailand.
- 1975 – a Category 2 hurricane that had minor effects in Bermuda.
- 1978 – stayed at sea.
- 1982 – a long-lived typhoon that struck the Philippines in August 1982.
- 1985 – a strong typhoon made landfall Philippines.
- 1989 – a strong tropical storm impact Philippines, South China and Vietnam.
- 1992 – a weak tropical storm hit Philippines and China.
- 1995 – passed South Korea, a rogue wave hitting Pusan Harbor, the largest port in South Korea, resulting in two ships collided.

- Fefa

- 1979 – remained well at sea.
- 1985 – moved parallel to the Mexican coastline.
- 1991† – eventually impacted Hawaii after being downgraded to a tropical depression.

- Fehi (2018) – took a south-southeast track across the South Pacific, transitioning to an extratropical cyclone as it approached New Zealand.
- Felice (1970) – a modest tropical cyclone that lightly affected parts of the Gulf Coast of the United States.
- Felicia

- 1997 – a Category 4 hurricane which formed in the open ocean, causing no known damage or casualties.
- 2000 – remained over the open ocean.
- 2003 – a moderate tropical storm which remained at sea, crossing into the Central Pacific, but then dissipated well east of Hawaii.
- 2009 – a Category 4 hurricane which remained at sea, dissipating before hitting Hawaii.
- 2015 – remained at sea as a weak tropical storm.
- 2021 – an unusually small Category 4 hurricane which formed and dissipated in the open ocean.

- Felicity

- 1973 – a weak tropical cyclone that never threatened land.
- 1989† – a Category 3 tropical cyclone minor damage to vegetation was recorded on the Cape York Peninsula.

- Felix

- 1980 – did not affect land.
- 1989 – Category 1 hurricane that did not threaten land.
- 1995 – Category 4 hurricane that passed very near Bermuda.
- 2001 – Category 3 hurricane that never threatened land.
- 2007† – Category 5 hurricane that made landfall in northern Nicaragua, causing at least 133 deaths and hundreds of millions of dollars in damages in Central America.

- Fengal (2024) – a moderate tropical cyclone that brought significant flooding and damage to Southern India and Sri Lanka.
- Fengshen

- 2002 – A Category 5 storm that remained over open waters for most of its life, then brushed southern Japan.
- 2008 – A Category 3 storm that wrecked the Philippines, capsizing the MV Princess of the Stars and killing hundreds, then caused flooding in mainland China.
- 2014 – a storm which formed during the weak peak of the season.
- 2019 – a very strong late season Category 4 typhoon that remained at sea.
- 2025 – a severe tropical storm that made landfall in Vietnam after causing significant impacts in parts of central Philippines.

- Ferdie

- 2012 – a Category 4 storm affecting the Philippines, Hong Kong, Macau and Guangdong, China.
- 2016 – an extremely powerful typhoon that made landfall in Itbayat, the Philippines near peak intensity and struck Taiwan and China afterwards, causing at least $4.7 billion worth of damage.
- 2020 – a severe tropical storm that affected China, causing moderate damage in the country.
- 2024 – passed the Ryukyu Islands and made landfall in Shanghai, China as the strongest storm since 1949.

- Ferdinand

- 1984 – a weak tropical cyclone paralleled the north coast of the Northern Territory until it made landfall near Maningrida causing minor damage.
- 2020 – without affecting any landmass.

- Fergus (1996)† – a tropical cyclone, later becoming an extratropical cyclone, that affected islands in the south-west Pacific Ocean.
- Feria

- 2001 – a large and deadly system that caused heavy rains and landslides throughout the Philippines, Taiwan, and China.
- 2005 – a Category 5 typhoon that made landfall in Taiwan and China.
- 2009† – traversed the Philippines and then made its final landfall in Guangdong, China.

- Fern

- 1967 – a Category 1 hurricane that hit the state of Veracruz with minor damage.
- 1971 – a Category 1 hurricane second Atlantic tropical cyclone to make U.S. landfall that year produced heavy rainfall across Louisiana and Texas.
- 1996 – a damaging storm that struck Yap in the 1996

- Fernand

- 2013 – a short-lived tropical storm that struck Veracruz, Mexico.
- 2019 – another short-lived tropical storm that made landfall over northeastern Mexico.
- 2025 – remained over the open ocean.

- Fernanda

- 1960 – Category 1 hurricane paralleled Mexico's coast.
- 1968 – never affected land.
- 1972 – this tropical cyclone caused no known impact.
- 1976 – never affected land.
- 1981 – never affected land.
- 1987 – never affected land.
- 1993 - threatened Hawaii but headed out to sea.
- 1999 – never affected land.
- 2005 – never affected land.
- 2011 – never affected land.
- 2017 – a powerful Category 4 hurricane second-most powerful hurricane at 10.9°N in the eastern pacific, after Hurricane Olaf.
- 2023 – a Category 4 hurricane that stayed away from land.

- Fernando (2017) – a tropical storm that never threatened land.
- Fezile (2022) – never affected land.
- Fico (1978)† – a longest-lived hurricane of the 1978 Pacific hurricane season and became the longest-lasting Pacific hurricane on record, a record broken by Hurricane Tina fourteen years later.
- Fifi

- 1958 – paralleled the Lesser Antilles without making landfall.
- 1974† – a devastating system that killed thousands in Honduras.
- 1977 – passed west of Réunion as a result of rainfall, flooding damaged crops and roads, one person died while trying to cross the flooded road.
- 1982 – severe tropical cyclone reaches Western Australia.
- 1991† – killed 29 in Western Australia.

- Filao (1988) – a moderately intense tropical cyclone that caused widespread flooding in Mozambique in 1988.
- Fili

- 1989 – caused minor damage in Niue
- 2003 – did not affect land
- 2022 – affected New Caledonia

- Filipo (2024) – a severe tropical storm that made landfall in Mozambique.
- Fina

- 2011 – stayed at sea and no deaths or damage were reported.
- 2025† – a Category 4 severe tropical cyclone that made landfall in the Northern Territory and Western Australia.

- Fiona

- 1971† – a severe tropical cyclone that made landfall in the northern coast of Australia.
- 1974 – operationally considered to be two separate storms, but reduced to one in post-analysis.
- 1998 – a weak tropical cyclone that churned off the coast of Madagascar.
- 2003 – brought significant rainfall to the western Australian coast.
- 2010 – a moderate but disorganized tropical storm, moved in the central Atlantic without threatening land.
- 2016 – a weak tropical storm that churned across the open ocean.
- 2022† – Category 4 hurricane that caused significant damage in Puerto Rico and Atlantic Canada.

- Firinga (1989) – produced record-breaking rainfall on the French overseas department of Réunion.
- Fitow

- 2001 – struck Hainan island and mainland China, killing 4.
- 2007 – struck Japan, killing at least 2.
- 2013† – a strongest typhoon to make landfall in Mainland China during October since 1949.

- Flamboyan (2018) – stayed at sea and no deaths or damage were reported.
- Fletcher (2014) – a weak system that produced torrential rains over parts of Queensland, Australia in February 2014.
- Flo

- 1948 – a system which was eventually considered to be a typhoon; affected South China.
- 1990 – a powerful tropical cyclone that made landfall in Japan, claiming 40 lives.
- 1993 – a minimal but erratic typhoon which devastated the Philippines and killed at least 500 people due to flooding.

- Flora

- 1947 – a powerful category 3 typhoon impact Philippines.
- 1955 – A category 2 hurricane, stayed at sea.
- 1959 – a category 1 hurricane minimal affected Azores.
- 1962 – a weak tropical storm not make landfall.
- 1963† – is among the deadliest Atlantic hurricanes in recorded history, with a death total of at least 7,193.
- 1964† – a category 3 tropical cyclone (Australian scale) impact in the Gulf of Carpentaria.
- 1975 – a Category 2 tropical cyclone (Australian scale) impact Vanuatu and New Caledonia.

- Florence

- 1953 – destroyed hundreds of homes in Florida, no deaths.
- 1954 – killed 5 and caused $1.5 million in damage in Mexico.
- 1960 – caused slight damage to Florida.
- 1963 – did not make landfall
- 1964 – passed west over the Azores while forming, went north, dissipated at sea.
- 1965 – stayed at sea and no deaths or damage were reported.
- 1969 – powerful tropical storm that affected the state of Baja California.
- 1973 – stayed at sea and no deaths or damage were reported.
- 1977 – stayed at sea and no deaths or damage were reported.
- 1988 – formed in western Gulf of Mexico, passed over New Orleans and Lake Pontchartrain.
- 1994 – absorbed by a cold front without threatening land.
- 2000 – meandered near Bermuda but caused no damage.
- 2006 – struck Bermuda and later Newfoundland.
- 2012 – formed near the Cape Verde Islands.
- 2018† – peaked as a category 4, killed 57 people and caused extensive damage in both North and South Carolina.

- Florita

- 2002 – the first of four typhoons to contribute to heavy rainfall and deadly flooding in the Philippines in July 2002.
- 2006 – a weak tropical cyclone in July 2006 that caused significant damage to areas of the Philippines, Taiwan, and southeastern China.
- 2010 – made landfall on the east coast of Guangdong Province, China, just north of the city of Shantou.
- 2014 – a large and powerful tropical cyclone which struck Japan in 2014.
- 2018 – a typhoon that worsened the floods in Japan and also caused impacts in South Korea.
- 2022† – struck the northern Philippines, South China and northern Vietnam.

- Flossie

- 1950 – a weak tropical storm made landfall near Japan.
- 1954 – tracked into open waters
- 1956 – a tropical cyclone led to flooding in New Orleans, and broke a drought across the eastern United States the death toll was 15, and total damages reached $24.8 million.
- 1958 – affected Japan.
- 1961 – a weak tropical storm made landfall Philippines and South China.
- 1964 – struck China.
- 1966 – stayed at sea.
- 1969 – approached Taiwan heavy rains left 75 people dead.
- 1972 – a category 1 typhoon made landfall Philippines and Vietnam a tropical depression as it crossed Vietnam, but it reintensified after entering the Bay of Bengal as Tropical Cyclone 25-72.
- 1975 – struck southern China.
- 1978 – stayed at sea.
- 1983 – did not make landfall.
- 1989 – did not make landfall.
- 1995 – a tropical cyclone which impacted Mexico and Arizona in August 1995.
- 2001 – stayed at sea.
- 2007 – a powerful pacific tropical cyclone that brought squally weather and light damage to Hawaii in August 2007.
- 2013 – almost made landfall in Hawaii, but moved to the north and weakened.
- 2019 – neared Hawaii as a tropical depression.
- 2025 – Category 3 hurricane that paralleled the Mexican coast.

- Floyd

- 1981 – caused heavy rainfall on the Leeward Islands, then passed near Bermuda but caused no major damage.
- 1987 – crossed over Cuba and impacted the Florida Keys and the Bahamas, but no major damage.
- 1993 – made a circuit of the Atlantic before striking Brittany as a strong extratropical storm.
- 1999† – deadliest United States hurricane in 27 years, killing 56 in the U.S. and one in the Bahamas, and causing $4.5 billion in damage, at the time the third-costliest storm in U.S. history.
- 2006 – a storm that peaked at Category 4 on the Australian intensity scale.

- Forrest

- 1980 – hit the Philippines.
- 1983 – a powerful tropical cyclone on record, with its minimum barometric pressure dropping 100 mbar (3.0 inHg) from September 22 to September 23, in less than a day.
- 1986 – stayed at sea.
- 1988 – stayed at sea.
- 1992 – a powerful tropical cyclone that prompted the evacuation of 600,000 people in Bangladesh in late November 1992.

- Fox

- 1950 – a Category 4 hurricane never affected land.
- 1951 – a category 3 hurricane Although a few ships were affected by the hurricane's winds, there were no reports of any damage.
- 1952 – a powerful category 4 hurricane the second most intense hurricane to strike Cuba until Hurricane Michelle.

- Fran

- 1950 – a late season storm that struck the northern Philippines killing 5 people.
- 1955 – did not make landfall.
- 1959 – Japan Meteorological Agency analyzed it as a tropical depression, not as a tropical storm.
- 1962 –
- 1964 –
- 1967 –
- 1970 – making landfall in China on the 7th.
- 1973 (July) –
- 1973 (October) – a long-tracked Category 1 hurricane that caused little damage during its existence in early October 1973.
- 1976 – hit southwestern Japan and caused heavy flooding and wind damage.
- 1984 – formed close enough to Cape Verde to cause tropical storm-force winds there, but otherwise threatened no land.
- 1990 – formed near Cape Verde; it passed between Trinidad and Venezuela, losing strength rapidly and causing no significant damage.
- 1992† – a tropical cyclone within four weeks to impact Vanuatu in 1992.
- 1996† – made landfall near Cape Fear, North Carolina as a Category 3, killing 26 and causing $3.2 billion in damages.

- Francene

- 1967 – a weak tropical storm never affected land.
- 1971 – stayed over open water and did not affect land.
- 1975 – a weak tropical storm that caused no known impact.

- Frances

- 1961 – caused flooding in Puerto Rico, peaked at Category 4 west of Bermuda, subtropical at Nova Scotia.
- 1968 – travelled across the central Atlantic Ocean without affecting land.
- 1976 – curved over the central Atlantic, affected the Azores as an extratropical storm.
- 1980 – travelled up the central Atlantic Ocean without affecting land.
- 1986 – briefly drifted over the western Atlantic but never affected land.
- 1992 – threatened Bermuda but did not strike the island, then hit Spain as an extratropical storm.
- 1998 – a weak storm that caused flooding in East Texas and southern Louisiana.
- 2004† – a powerful Category 4 hurricane that struck the Bahamas, and later, as a Category 2 storm, moved extremely slowly over Florida, causing billions in damage.
- 2017 – a Category 3 severe tropical cyclone that minimal affected Northern Territory.

- Francesca

- 1966 – a Category 1 hurricane, did not make landfall.
- 1970 – stayed over open water and did not affect land.
- 1974 – a Category 1 hurricane it neared Baja California by the 17th but turned away before striking.
- 2002 – a Category 4 tropical cyclone, did not make landfall.

- Francine

- 1966 – a weak tropical depression minimal affected Madagascar.
- 2024 – a Category 2 hurricane that made landfall in Louisiana.

- Francisco

- 2001 – a strong typhoon that never impacted land.
- 2007 – a minimal tropical storm that struck southern China.
- 2013 – is the 4th super typhoon of the season, which steered well away from Japan.
- 2019 — a minimal typhoon that made landfall over Japan and Korea.
- 2020 - a minimal tropical storm which affected Madagascar.
- 2025 – minimal tropical storm that passed through the Ryukyu Islands before making landfall in China.
- 2026 – a Category 4 typhoon that recurved to Japan after affecting the Philippines and Taiwan.

- Frank

- 1980 – a weak tropical storm that never impacted land.
- 1984† – a significant tropical cyclone which formed off the western coast of Australia.
- 1986 – stayed at sea and no deaths or damage were reported.
- 1992 – a Category 4 hurricane never affected land.
- 1995 – a powerful tropical cyclone brought heavy winds and rains to the Pilbara coast was one of four cyclones to strike in that area.
- 1998 – a weak tropical storm that affected Baja California Sur.
- 1999† – formed from the remnants of Cyclone Rona off the coast of Queensland and affected New Caledonia.
- 2004 (January) – a Category 4 tropical cyclone did not make landfall.
- 2004 (June) – made landfall as a minimal tropical storm in the Kōchi Prefecture, Japan.
- 2004 (August) – a Category 1 hurricane, did not make landfall.
- 2008† – made a direct hit on the Philippines and on China, causing severe damage and resulted in at least 1,371 deaths.
- 2010 – a Category 1 hurricane that caused minor damage in Mexico in late August 2010.
- 2016 – its outer rainbands brought heavy rains to southwestern Mexico.
- 2022 – a category 1 hurricane, did not make landfall.

- Frankie

- 1996 – a Category 2 typhoon that made landfall Hainan and Northern Vietnam.
- 1999 – a weak tropical system which was considered as a tropical storm by the Joint Typhoon Warning Center (JTWC) and PAGASA.

- Franklin

- 2005 - formed over the Bahamas, then moved erratically in the open ocean, never affecting land directly; twice approached hurricane status.
- 2011 - a weak tropical storm that never threatened land.
- 2017 - made landfall on the Yucatán Peninsula as a moderate tropical storm, then made a second landfall in Veracruz, Mexico as a Category 1 hurricane.
- 2023 – a large and strong Category 4 hurricane that made landfall in Hispaniola as a tropical storm.

- Fred

- 1980 – Category 4 severe tropical cyclone that stayed out at sea.
- 1981 – a category 2 typhoon that struck Hainan Island and Vietnam.
- 1994 – a category 4 super typhoon that struck China, resulting on over 1,000 deaths and damages estimated at $874.4 million (1994 USD).
- 2009 – Category 3 major hurricane that stayed out at sea.
- 2015 – Category 1 hurricane that remained over the open ocean.
- 2021 – made landfall in Hispaniola, degenerated into a tropical wave, then regenerated and made a second landfall in the Florida Panhandle at tropical storm strength.

- Freda

- 1952 – a short-lived tropical storm which impacted Kyushu.
- 1956 – a typhoon which hit Taiwan and China before affecting Japan and Alaska as a post-tropical system.
- 1959 – a strong, late-season typhoon that struck the Philippines, killing 58.
- 1962 – a typhoon which formed and remained in the open ocean but later struck the west coast of Canada and the Pacific Northwest coast of the United States as a potent extratropical cyclone, and became known as the Columbus Day Storm of 1962.
- 1965 (January) – a tropical cyclone which brought strong winds to Rodrigues and Mauritius.
- 1965 (July) – a strong typhoon that made landfall on northern Luzon and on Hainan Island.
- 1967 – a late-season typhoon which made landfall in the Philippines and in South Vietnam.
- 1971 – a moderate typhoon which hit northern Philippines and southern China.
- 1974 – a tropical storm that remained at sea.
- 1977 – a strong but short-lived tropical storm which struck Hong Kong.
- 1981 (February) – a powerful tropical cyclone which made landfall in New Caledonia.
- 1981 (March) – a strong early-season typhoon that remained in the open ocean.
- 1984 – a relatively strong tropical storm which struck northern Taiwan and eastern China.
- 1985 – a strong tropical cyclone that stayed at sea.
- 1987 – a violent typhoon that stayed at sea.
- 1997 – an erratic tropical cyclone which eventually affected no land areas.
- 2012† – a strong tropical cyclone that affected New Caledonia and the Solomon Islands.

- Freddy

- 2009 – A Category 1 tropical cyclone that caused heavy rainfall in Indonesia, two people died due to a landslide caused by the rainfall.
- 2023† – a Category 5 tropical cyclone that became the longest-lived tropical cyclone on record after having traversed the entirety of the southern Indian ocean from east to west.

- Frederic

- 1979† – an intense and damaging tropical cyclone that carved a path of destruction from the Lesser Antilles to Quebec, in particular devastating areas of the United States Gulf Coast.
- 1988 – a Category 1 tropical cyclone, mostly stayed at sea.
- 1999 – a category 5 tropical cyclone in the South Indian Ocean, remained mostly at sea.

- Frieda

- 1957 – a minimal hurricane that remained in the open ocean.
- 1977 – a weak and short-lived storm that caused moderate rainfall in Belize.

- Fritz

- 1983 – a Category 1 tropical cyclone that remained in the open ocean.
- 1997 – a severe tropical storm that made landfall Vietnam.
- 2004 – a Category 2 tropical cyclone that made landfall Queensland the remnant travelled over Northern Territory and Western Australia.

- Funa (2008)† – a Category 4 severe tropical cyclone that causing heavy flood and wind damage to areas of Vanuatu.
- Fung-wong

- 2002 – recurved out of the ocean.
- 2008 – a deadly typhoon in the 2008 Pacific typhoon season which made landfall on Taiwan and China.
- 2014 – a relatively weak tropical cyclone which affected the northern Philippines, Taiwan and the Eastern China.
- 2019 – churned out of the ocean.
- 2025† – a very large Category 4 typhoon that made landfall in the Philippines and Taiwan.

- Funso (2012) – a Category 4 tropical cyclone which produced flooding in Mozambique and Malawi.
- Fytia (2026) – a Category 3 tropical cyclone that made landfall in the Madagascar.

== See also ==
- Tropical cyclone
- Tropical cyclone naming
- European windstorm names
- Atlantic hurricane season
- List of Pacific hurricane seasons
- South Atlantic tropical cyclone
