= List of storms named Flora =

The name Flora has been used for seven tropical cyclones worldwide: three the Atlantic Ocean, one in the Western Pacific Ocean, two in the Australian region, and one in the South-West Indian Ocean.

In the Atlantic Ocean:

- Hurricane Flora (1955) – Category 2 hurricane, stayed at sea
- Hurricane Flora (1959) – Category 1 hurricane that traversed the Azores
- Hurricane Flora (1963) – Category 4 hurricane, caused 7,193 fatalities, primarily in the Greater Antilles

The name Flora was later retired and replaced by Fern.

In the Western Pacific Ocean:

- Typhoon Flora (1947) – powerful Category 3 typhoon that impacted Philippines

In the Australian Region:

- Cyclone Flora (1964) – Category 3 tropical cyclone (Australian scale) impact in the Gulf of Carpentaria
- Cyclone Flora (1975) – Category 2 tropical cyclone (Australian scale) impact Vanuatu and New Caledonia

In the South-West Indian Ocean:

- Tropical Storm Flora (1962) – a weak tropical storm not make landfall
