= List of storms named Florence =

The name Florence has been used for fifteen tropical cyclones worldwide, ten in the Atlantic Ocean and five in the Eastern Pacific Ocean.

In the Atlantic:

- Hurricane Florence (1953) – destroyed hundreds of homes in Florida, no deaths.
- Tropical Storm Florence (1954) – killed 5 and caused $1.5 million in damage in Mexico.
- Tropical Storm Florence (1960) – caused slight damage to Florida.
- Tropical Storm Florence (1964) – passed west over the Azores while forming, went north, dissipated at sea.
- Hurricane Florence (1988) – formed in western Gulf of Mexico, passed over New Orleans and Lake Pontchartrain.
- Hurricane Florence (1994) – absorbed by a cold front without threatening land.
- Hurricane Florence (2000) – meandered near Bermuda but caused no damage.
- Hurricane Florence (2006) – struck Bermuda and later Newfoundland.
- Tropical Storm Florence (2012) – formed near the Cape Verde Islands.
- Hurricane Florence (2018) – peaked as a Category 4, killed 54 people and caused extensive damage in both North and South Carolina.

The World Meteorological Organization retired the name Florence from future use in the Atlantic basin after the 2018 season. It was replaced with Francine for the 2024 season.

In the Eastern Pacific:

- Hurricane Florence (1963)
- Tropical Storm Florence (1965)
- Tropical Storm Florence (1969)
- Hurricane Florence (1973)
- Hurricane Florence (1977)
