= List of storms named Faith =

The name Faith has been used for four tropical cyclones worldwide: one in the Atlantic Ocean, two in the Western Pacific Ocean and one in the Australian Region.

Atlantic:

- Hurricane Faith (1966) – a long-lived Cape Verde hurricane that had impacts from the Lesser Antilles to Scandinavia

The name, Faith was dropped in the Atlantic basin following the 1966 season, and was replaced by Felice for the 1970 season.

Western Pacific:

- Tropical Storm Faith (1947) – a strong tropical storm minimal affected Taiwan and Japan.
- Typhoon Faith (1998) – struck both the Philippines and Vietnam during December 1998.

Australian region:

- Cyclone Faith (1972) – a Category 1 tropical cyclone (Australian scale) impact Queensland.
