= List of storms named Fefa =

The name Fefa was used for three tropical cyclones in the Eastern Pacific Ocean.

- Hurricane Fefa (1979) – remained well at sea.
- Tropical Storm Fefa (1985) – moved parallel to the Mexican coastline.
- Hurricane Fefa (1991) – eventually impacted Hawaii after being downgraded to a tropical depression.

The name Fefa was retired in the spring of 1992, and replaced with Felicia in the 1997 season.
