= List of storms named Freddy =

The name Freddy has been used for two tropical cyclones in the Australian region of the Southern Hemisphere. The more recent of the two crossed into the South-West Indian Ocean region.

- Cyclone Freddy (2009) – Category 1 tropical cyclone that caused heavy rainfall in Indonesia, killing two
- Cyclone Freddy (2023) – Category 5 tropical cyclone which became the longest-lived and highest-ACE-producing tropical cyclone on record; severely affected Malawi, Mozambique and Madagascar, causing at least 1430 deaths

As a result of the major loss of life and damage in Malawi and surrounding countries, the name Freddy was removed from the rotating lists of Australian region cyclone names and will never be used to name a storm in that basin again. The name was replaced with Frederic for future seasons.

== See also ==
- List of storms named Fred, a similar name used in multiple tropical cyclone basins
- List of storms named Frederic, a similar name used in multiple tropical cyclone basins
