= List of storms named Fred =

The name Fred has been used for a total of six tropical cyclones worldwide, three in the Atlantic Ocean, two in the Western Pacific Ocean, and one in the Australian region of the Indian Ocean. It replaced the name "Fabian", which was retired after the 2003 season.

In the Atlantic:

- Hurricane Fred (2009) – Category 3 major hurricane that stayed out at sea.
- Hurricane Fred (2015) – Category 1 hurricane that made landfall in Cape Verde.
- Tropical Storm Fred (2021) – made landfall in Hispaniola, degenerated into a tropical wave, then regenerated and made a second landfall in the Florida Panhandle at tropical storm strength.

In the Western Pacific:

- Typhoon Fred (1991) (T9111, 12W) – Category 2 typhoon that struck Hainan Island and Vietnam.
- Typhoon Fred (1994) (T9416, 19W, Susang) – Category 4 super typhoon that struck China, resulting on over 1,000 deaths and damages estimated at $874.4 million (1994 USD).

In the Australian Region:

- Cyclone Fred (1980) – Category 4 severe tropical cyclone that stayed out at sea.

== See also ==
- List of storms named Frederic, a similar name used in the Atlantic Ocean and the Australian region.
- List of storms named Freddy, another similar name used in the Southern Hemisphere.
