= List of storms named Flo =

The name Flo has been used for three tropical cyclones worldwide, all in the Western North Pacific Ocean.

- Typhoon Flo (1948) – a system which was eventually considered to be a typhoon; affected South China.
- Typhoon Flo (1990) (T9019, 20W, Norming) – a powerful tropical cyclone that made landfall in Japan, claiming 40 lives.
- Typhoon Flo (1993) (T9320, 26W, Kadiang) – a minimal but erratic typhoon which devastated the Philippines and killed at least 500 people due to flooding.
