= List of storms named Fritz =

The name Fritz has been used for three tropical cyclones worldwide, one in the Western Pacific Ocean and two in the Australian Region. In the Western Pacific:

- Tropical Storm Fritz (1997) – a severe tropical storm that made landfall in Vietnam.

In the Australian Region:

- Cyclone Fritz (1983) – a Category 1 tropical cyclone that remained in the open ocean.
- Cyclone Fritz (2004) – a Category 2 tropical cyclone that made landfall in Queensland, the remnant travelled over Northern Territory and Western Australia.
