= List of storms named Frankie =

The name Frankie was used for two tropical cyclones in the Western Pacific Ocean:

- Tropical Storm Frankie (1996) – a Category 2 typhoon that made landfall Hainan and Northern Vietnam.
- Tropical Storm Frankie (1999) – a weak tropical storm brought heavy rain of to the central Philippines, that caused flooding from the storm forced the evacuation of 300 families in Calbayog.
