= List of storms named Fox =

The name Fox was used for three tropical cyclones in the Atlantic Ocean.

- Hurricane Fox (1950) – a Category 4 hurricane that never affected land.
- Hurricane Fox (1951) – a Category 3 hurricane. Although a few ships were affected by the hurricane's winds, there were no reports of any damage.
- Hurricane Fox (1952) – a powerful Category 4 hurricane, the second most intense hurricane to strike Cuba until Hurricane Michelle.
