= List of storms named Felicity =

The name Felicity has been used for two tropical cyclones worldwide: one in the Australian region and one in the South Pacific Ocean:

In the Australian region:

- Cyclone Felicity (1989) – a Category 3 tropical cyclone, minor damage to vegetation was recorded on the Cape York Peninsula.

In the South Pacific:

- Cyclone Felicity (1973) – a weak tropical cyclone that never threatened land.
