= List of storms named Ferdinand =

The name Ferdinand has been used for two tropical cyclones in the Australian region.

- Cyclone Ferdinand (1984) – a weak tropical cyclone paralleled the north coast of the Northern Territory until it made landfall near Maningrida causing minor damage.
- Cyclone Ferdinand (2020) – without affecting any landmass.
