= Hurricane Florence (1953) =

Category 3 Atlantic hurricane in 1953

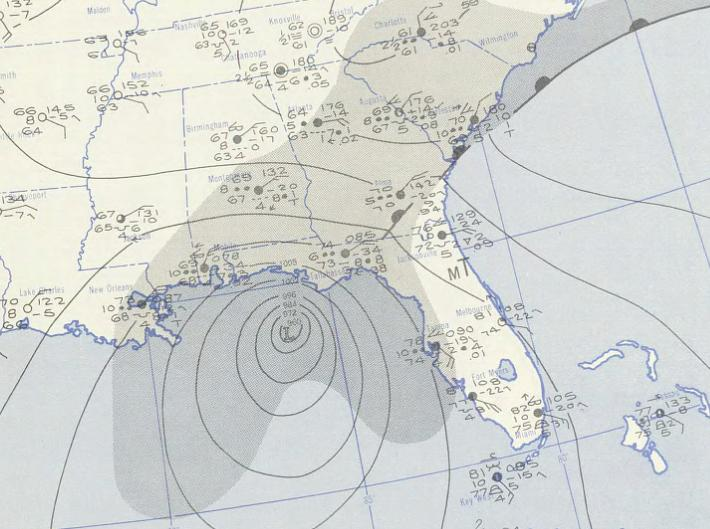
- September 26, 1953 weather map featuring Hurricane Florence

Meteorological history
- Formed: September 23, 1953
- Dissipated: September 26, 1953

Category 3 major hurricane
- 1-minute sustained (SSHWS/NWS)
- Highest winds: 115 mph (185 km/h)
- Lowest pressure: 968 mbar (hPa); 28.59 inHg

Overall effects
- Fatalities: None
- Damage: $200,000 (1953 USD)
- Areas affected: Jamaica, Cuba, Gulf Coast of the United States, Southeast United States
- IBTrACS
- Part of the 1953 Atlantic hurricane season

Hurricane Florence was a strong Atlantic hurricane that struck the Florida Panhandle in September of the 1953 season. The eighth storm and fifth hurricane of the season, Florence developed in the western Caribbean from a tropical wave near Jamaica on September 23. It produced heavy rainfall on the nearby island, and later caused damage in western Cuba. The storm quickly intensified into a hurricane over the Yucatán Channel, and as it moved north through the Gulf of Mexico, Florence's maximum sustained winds reached 125 mph (201 km/h). On September 26, the hurricane hit in a sparsely populated region of western Florida, and shortly after landfall became an extratropical cyclone.

Damage from Florence, with 421 houses damaged and another three destroyed. The winds destroyed the roofs of three evacuation shelters, resulting in one injury. The city of Apalachicola, Florida was temporarily isolated due to the storm's impact. There were no deaths associated with Florence, and damage totaled $200,000 (1953 USD, $2.35 million 2025 USD). After becoming extratropical, the remnants continued to the northeast, producing rainfall along its path before dissipating on September 28 southeast of New England.

== Meteorological history ==
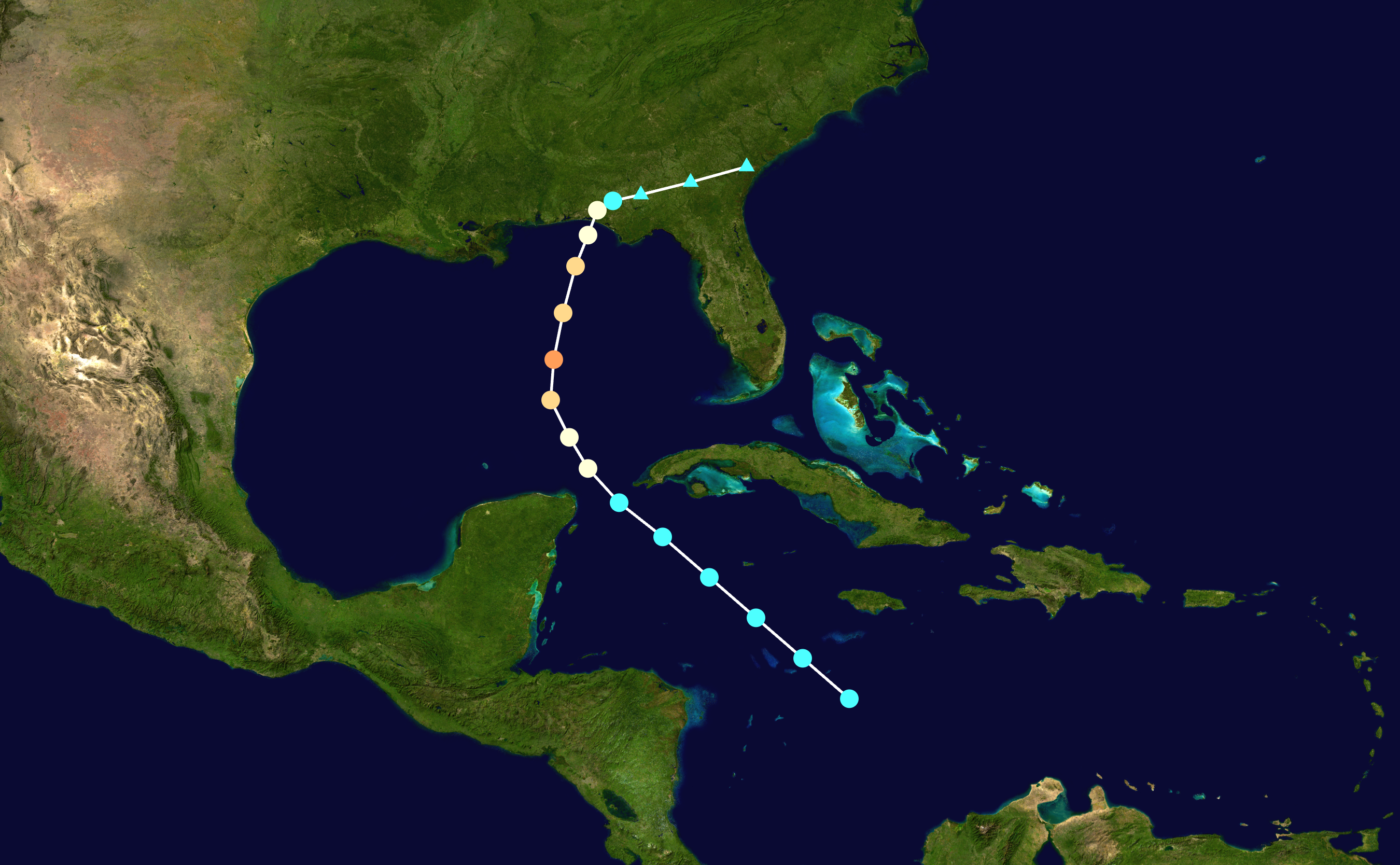
Map plotting the storm's track and intensity, according to the Saffir–Simpson scale Map key Saffir–Simpson scale Tropical depression (≤38 mph, ≤62 km/h) Tropical storm (39–73 mph, 63–118 km/h) Category 1 (74–95 mph, 119–153 km/h) Category 2 (96–110 mph, 154–177 km/h) Category 3 (111–129 mph, 178–208 km/h) Category 4 (130–156 mph, 209–251 km/h) Category 5 (≥157 mph, ≥252 km/h) Unknown Storm type Tropical cyclone Subtropical cyclone Extratropical cyclone, remnant low, tropical disturbance, or monsoon depression

The origins of Hurricane Florence were from a tropical wave that moved through the Lesser Antilles into the eastern Caribbean on September 21. The wave tracked generally westward, and spawned a tropical storm on September 23 about 100 mi (160 km) southeast of Jamaica. Given the name Florence, the storm steadily intensified after developing, although a well-defined circulation was not observed until September 24. That day, Florence attained hurricane status in the Yucatán Channel between the Yucatán Peninsula and the western tip of Cuba.

After turning north and entering the Gulf of Mexico, Florence quickly intensified, with the Hurricane Hunters estimating winds of 125 to 140 mph (201 to 225 km/h). However, the official peak intensity was later reanalyzed as 115 mph (185 km/h), along with a pressure of 968.0 mb (28.59 inHg), as the estimate of the peak winds was considered to have been too high, as ships in the region did not confirm them. On September 26, it began quickly weakening, due to a combination of colder water temperatures and cool air. At around 1800 UTC that day, Florence made landfall in a sparsely populated area between Fort Walton and Panama City Beach, Florida with winds of 80 mph (130 km/h). Within six hours after moving ashore, the hurricane had transitioned into an extratropical cyclone near the borders of Florida, Alabama, and Georgia. The remnants of Florence turned the northeast along a cold front, crossing Georgia before emerging near Savannah. The storm paralleled the Carolinas just offshore, dissipating on September 28 southeast of New England.

== Preparations and impact ==
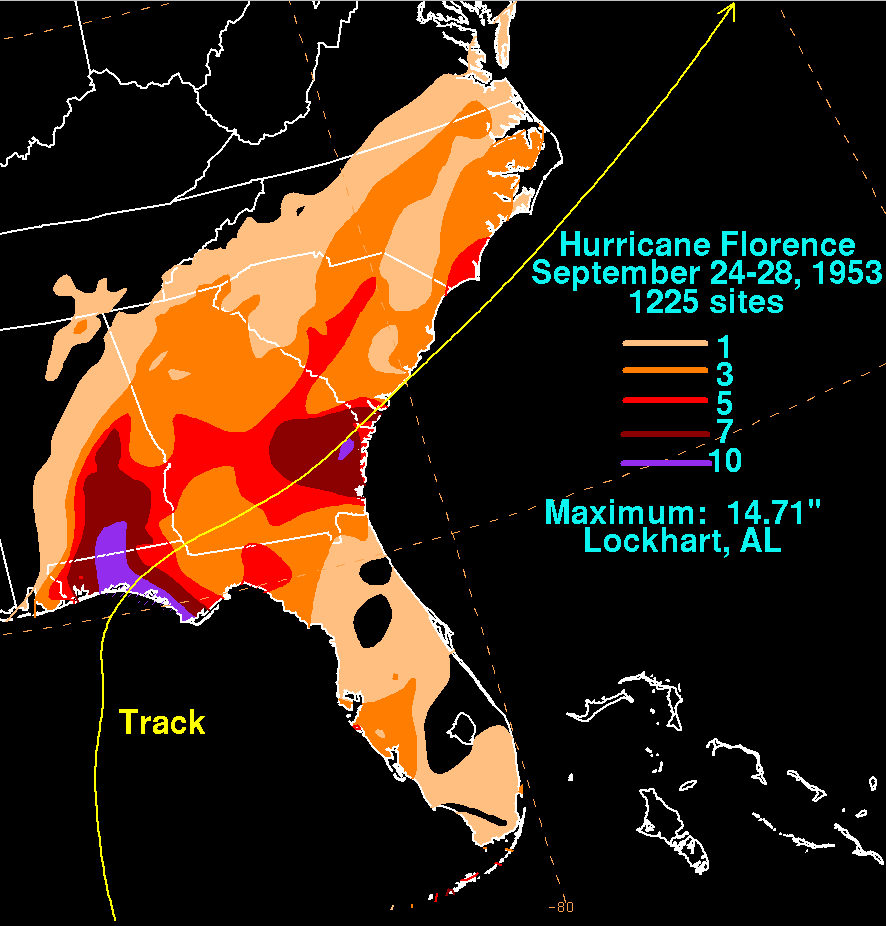
Rainfall from Florence in the United States

While the storm was first developing, Florence dropped heavy rainfall up to 10 in (250 mm) in Jamaica, which isolated villages and blocked roads. Early in its existence, Hurricane Florence produced strong winds and waves along the west coast of Cuba, producing locally heavy damage. Prior to the hurricane making landfall on the United States Gulf Coast, the Weather Bureau issued warnings and recommended evacuations, which were credited in preventing any deaths or major injuries. In Florida and Alabama, the National Guard were activated in the event of heavy damage being caused, although they were ultimately not required. The Air Force flew hundreds of planes away from the region for safety. In addition, the Coast Guard drove along the beach to warn people of the approaching hurricane. In Panama City, Florida, about 10,000 people were evacuated. All warnings related to the hurricane were lowered by the New Orleans U.S. Weather Bureau office at 4 pm CDT on September 26. Offshore, a United States Coast Guard ship came to a standstill for 18 hours from the morning of September 25 into the early morning hours of September 26 while battling the cyclone out in the Gulf of Mexico.

The strongest winds recorded were 84 mph (135 km/h) at Eglin Air Force Base. Although Florence made landfall in Florida, the heaviest rainfall related to Florence was 14.71 in (374 mm) in Lockhart, Alabama. Two intense rainbands, one on each side of the center, were responsible for the heaviest rainfall from the hurricane, including hourly rainfall rates of over 1.5 in (38 mm). Panama City reported 3.66 in (93 millimetres) in a three-hour period. The combination of winds and heavy rainfall caused minor crop damage in the Florida panhandle and southeastern Alabama. Along the coast, Florence damaged 421 houses and destroyed three others. The winds destroyed the roofs of three shelters – one at Eglin Air Force Base and two in Crestview, Florida, forcing the evacuees to leave for safer areas; one person was injured in the process. The winds also destroyed the roofs of nine houses in Crestview. Strong waves, reaching up to 14 ft (4.3 m) in height, damaged 100 ft (30 m) of a fishing pier in Panama City. The waves also washed over portions of U.S. Route 98 near Apalachicola, leaving the city isolated after power lines were downed.

Due to the strongest winds affecting a sparsely populated area near the coast, overall damage in the United States was minor, estimated around $200,000 (1953 USD, $2.35 million 2025 USD). Heavy rainfall was reported in portions Alabama, including a total of 8.72 in (221 mm), one inch shy of the 24‑hour precipitation record in Montgomery set in 1892. There, the rainfall backed up sewer drains, flooding homes and cars. The storm left about 4,000 people without electricity in the area. While Florence moved across the southeastern United States, the heaviest rainfall fell to the near and left of its center, due to interaction with a cold front.

== See also ==
- List of Florida hurricanes (1950–1974)
- List of North Carolina hurricanes (1950–1979)
- Other storms of the same name
