= List of storms named Fanny =

The name Fanny has been used for three tropical cyclones worldwide: two in the South-West Indian Ocean and one in the South Pacific Ocean:

In the South-West Indian Ocean:

- Tropical Storm Fanny (1963) – a strong tropical storm, mostly stayed at sea.
- Cyclone Fanny (1969) – a strong tropical cyclone.

In the South Pacific:

- Cyclone Fanny (1970) – a strong tropical cyclone that impacted Vanuatu and New Caledonia.
