= List of storms named Fili =

The name Fili has been used for three tropical cyclones in the South Pacific Ocean:

- Cyclone Fili (1989) – caused minor damage in Niue
- Cyclone Fili (2003) – did not affect land
- Cyclone Fili (2022) – affected New Caledonia
