= Hurricane Fern =

Category 1 Atlantic hurricane in 1971

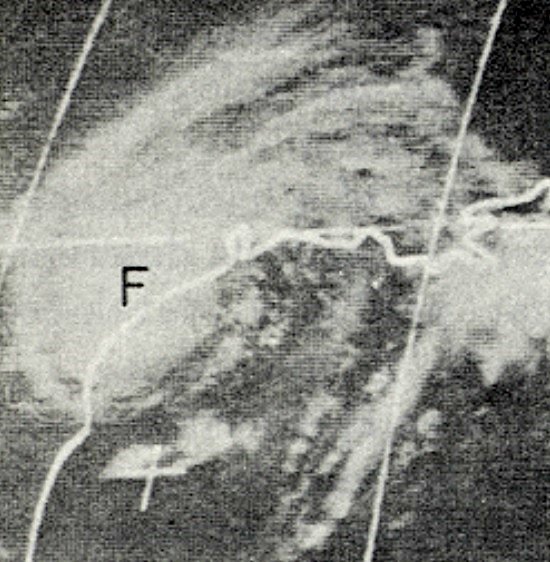
- Fern making landfall

Meteorological history
- Formed: September 3, 1971
- Dissipated: September 13, 1971

Category 1 hurricane
- 1-minute sustained (SSHWS/NWS)
- Highest winds: 90 mph (150 km/h)
- Lowest pressure: 979 mbar (hPa); 28.91 inHg

Overall effects
- Fatalities: 2 indirect
- Damage: $30.2 million (1971 USD)
- Areas affected: Louisiana, Texas, northern Mexico
- IBTrACS
- Part of the 1971 Atlantic hurricane season

Hurricane Fern was an erratic and damaging Category 1 hurricane which made landfall in southeastern Louisiana and Texas, United States. Fern was the sixth named storm and fourth hurricane of the 1971 Atlantic hurricane season. It formed from a tropical wave which interacted with a large trough of low pressure to form Fern, as well as Hurricane Ginger, Tropical Storm Heidi, and a system later designated as Tropical Depression Sixteen, which moved into South Carolina. Fern crossed southeastern Louisiana as a tropical depression on September 4 before swinging back out over the Gulf of Mexico. Fern reached hurricane status on September 8, reaching a peak intensity of 90 mph (140 km/h) before making landfall near Freeport, Texas, two days later.

Fern's path was erratic: it made three sharp turns during its duration, making it difficult for forecasters to track. The second Atlantic tropical cyclone to make U.S. landfall that year, Fern produced heavy rainfall across Louisiana and Texas, causing flash flooding that left 2 indirect fatalities and damage totaling over $30 million (1971 USD, 231 million 2026 USD).

== Meteorological history ==
Map plotting the storm's track and intensity, according to the Saffir–Simpson scale Map key Saffir–Simpson scale Tropical depression (≤38 mph, ≤62 km/h) Tropical storm (39–73 mph, 63–118 km/h) Category 1 (74–95 mph, 119–153 km/h) Category 2 (96–110 mph, 154–177 km/h) Category 3 (111–129 mph, 178–208 km/h) Category 4 (130–156 mph, 209–251 km/h) Category 5 (≥157 mph, ≥252 km/h) Unknown Storm type Tropical cyclone Subtropical cyclone Extratropical cyclone, remnant low, tropical disturbance, or monsoon depression

A northwestward moving tropical wave moved out the Caribbean Sea on September 1 and became a tropical depression on September 2 after crossing southern Florida. Still moving northwestward, the tropical depression made landfall in southeastern Louisiana on September 4. A building high pressure system over the Central United States forced the tropical depression to move southwest over the Gulf of Mexico. The warm waters then caused the depression to reach tropical storm strength and the storm was given the name Fern by the National Hurricane Center on September 7.

The following day, Fern reached hurricane status as it neared the Texas coastline. The hurricane reached a peak intensity of 90 mph (140 km/h) and its barometric pressure dropped to 979 millibars. An incoming mid-latitude trough caused Fern to stall east of Texas for twelve hours. After the trough moved by, Fern turned southwest, paralleling the Texas coastline before making landfall on September 10 between Freeport and Matagorda.

At landfall, Fern had weakened to a strong tropical storm as it moved further inland. Because the center of Fern was elongated, it was still able to receive moisture from the Gulf of Mexico and as a result, weakening was slow. Between September 10 and September 11, Fern bypassed Corpus Christi, Texas, before dissipating as a tropical depression after crossing the Rio Grande into northern Mexico.

== Preparations ==
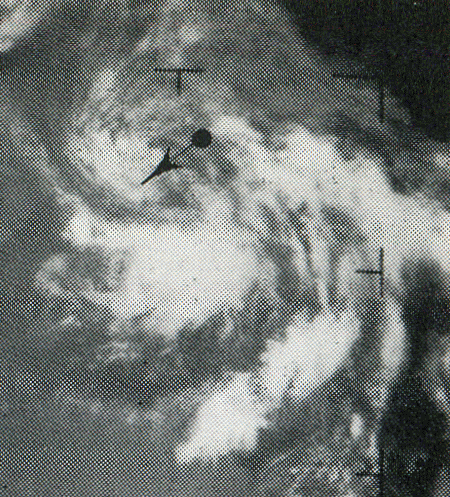
Tropical Depression Fern just offshore the Louisiana coast on September 6, 1971

At the time of its formation, forecasters determined that Fern might loop around in the Gulf of Mexico and it was more threatening to land than Hurricane Edith which was also projected to hit the Gulf Coast. On September 9, as Fern was becoming organized, forecasters issued a hurricane watch along the Texas coast, anticipating that Fern might strengthen into a hurricane. In addition, small boats were warned to stay in port and residents were advised to be aware of storm conditions brought by Fern. The next day, the hurricane watches were changed to warnings, forcing residents living on the Texas coast to board up and evacuate. In preparation for the storm's impact, Civil Defense workers and the American Red Cross were put on alert. In Galveston, eight emergency shelters were planned to open but five were closed when officials learned that they were not needed as most residents chose to ride out the storm in their homes. When Fern moved inland, the National Weather Service issued 21 tornado warnings and numerous flood warnings. In North Beach, city buses were used to transport evacuees inland and local officials were concerned about what to do with the relief trailers used to house survivors of Hurricane Celia a year earlier.

== Impact ==
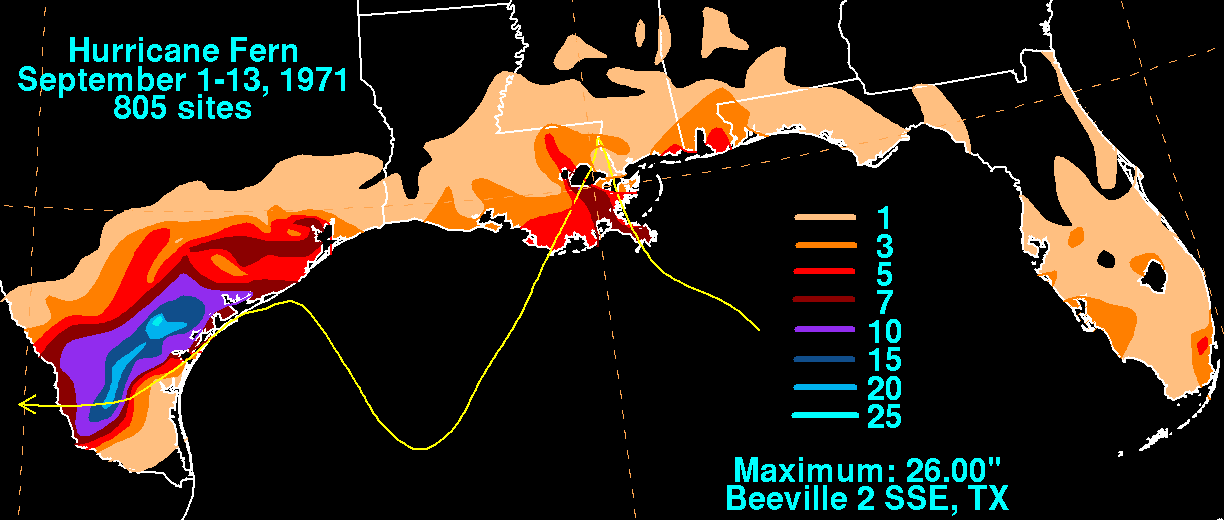
Rainfall totals from Hurricane Fern

The precursor disturbance which later became Fern dropped rainfall up to 5 inches (130 mm) of rainfall across South Florida. Central and Northern Florida received 1 to 3 inches (25 to 76 mm) of rain. In Louisiana, after making landfall as a tropical depression, Fern produced rainfall up to 10 inches (250 mm) across the southeastern part of the state, including up to 7 inches (180 mm) in New Orleans. The outer bands of the tropical depression brought 3 to 5 inches (76 to 127 mm) of rain across the coastal sections of Mississippi and Alabama. There were no reports of damage or fatalities in either Florida or the eastern U.S. Gulf Coast.

As Fern made its final landfall, a weather station in Port O'Connor, Texas recorded a sustained wind speed of 86 miles per hour (138 km/h). In Corpus Christi, winds up to 66 miles per hour (106 km/h) were reported. In coastal Texas, storm tides of 5 to 6 feet (1.5 to 1.8 m) above normal were reported from Galveston to Freeport. One spotter reported seeing a flock of swallows in the eye of the storm during landfall. Heavy rainfall from the hurricane fell across eastern and central Texas. A total of 10 to 26 inches (250 to 660 mm) of rain was measured in a stripe from Bee to San Patricio County. Other locations in Texas reported rainfall of 10 to 15 inches (250 to 380 mm), while areas from Galveston to Rockport received 5 to 12 inches (130 to 300 mm) of rain. The heavy rainfall caused severe flash flooding that isolated numerous small towns in eastern and central Texas. An outbreak of five tornadoes was reported during Fern's landfall, two of which caused minor tree and roof damage in Texas City. In addition, lightning from the hurricane caused six reported house fires on Galveston Island while 7,500 homes and business were damaged (mainly by flooding) near Corpus Christi. Two indirect fatalities were reported, both from drowning incidents, while on Mustang Island, the hurricane caused four Cuban fishing boats to run aground. In all, the storm left $30.2 million (1971 USD, $232 million 2026 USD) in damage and two deaths.

== See also ==
- List of wettest tropical cyclones in Texas
- Other storms of the same name
