= List of storms named Felicia =

The name Felicia has been used for five tropical cyclones in the Eastern Pacific Ocean. Felicia replaced Fefa which was retired in 1992.

- Hurricane Felicia (1997) – a Category 4 hurricane which formed in the open ocean, causing no known damage or casualties.
- Tropical Storm Felicia (2003) – a moderate tropical storm which remained at sea, crossing into the Central Pacific, but then dissipated well east of Hawaii.
- Hurricane Felicia (2009) – a Category 4 hurricane which remained at sea, dissipating before hitting Hawaii.
- Tropical Storm Felicia (2015) – remained at sea as a weak tropical storm.
- Hurricane Felicia (2021) – an unusually small Category 4 hurricane which formed and dissipated in the open ocean.

In the South-West Indian:

- Tropical Storm Felicia (2000) – remained over the open ocean.
