= 1971–72 Australian region cyclone season =

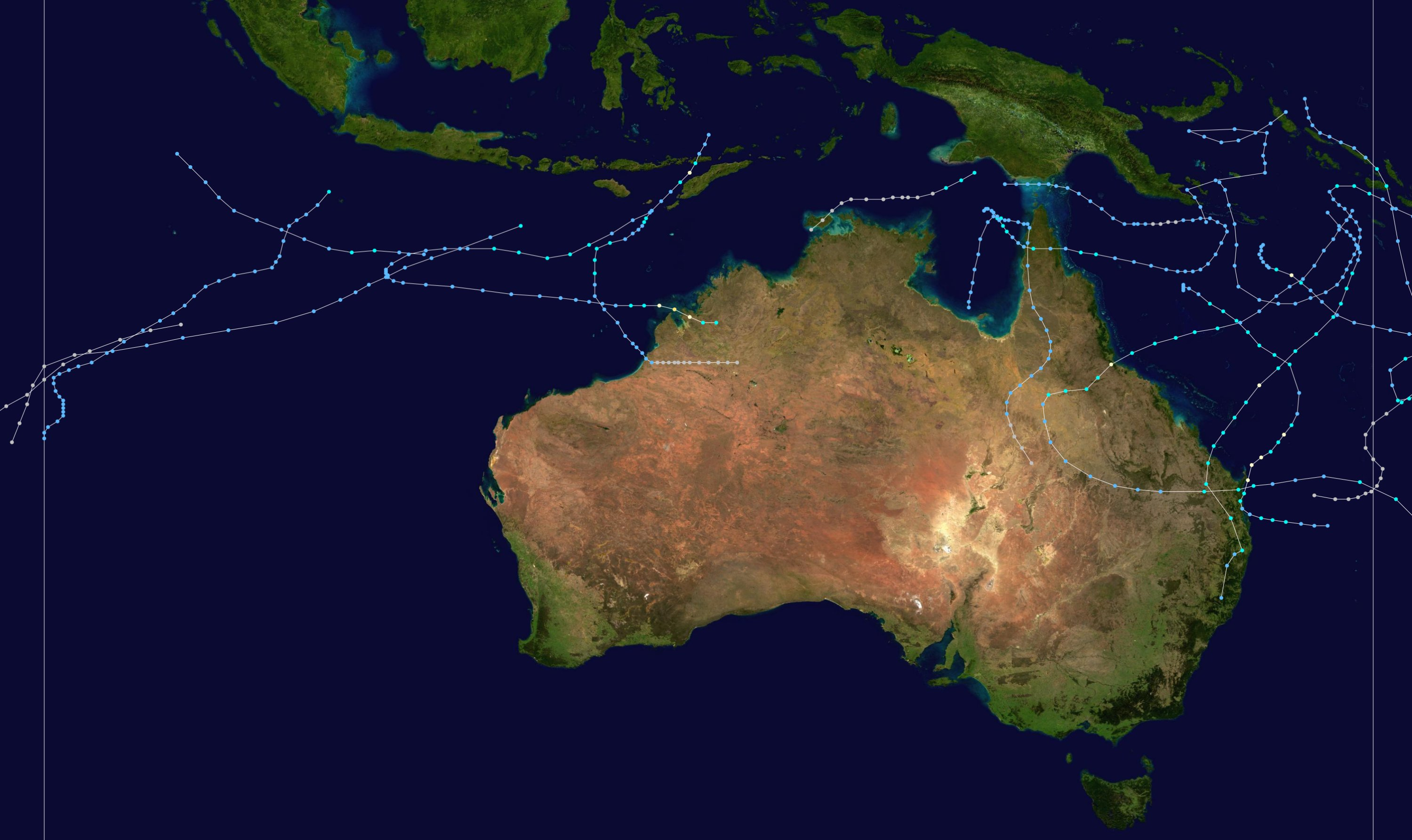
- Season summary map

Seasonal boundaries
- First system formed: 20 October 1971
- Last system dissipated: 1 June 1972

Strongest storm
- Name: Emily
  - Maximum winds: 185 km/h (115 mph) (10-minute sustained)
  - Lowest pressure: 942 hPa (mbar)

Seasonal statistics
- Tropical lows: 18
- Tropical cyclones: 17
- Severe tropical cyclones: 12
- Total fatalities: Unknown
- Total damage: Unknown

Related articles
- 1971–72 South Pacific cyclone season; 1971–72 South-West Indian Ocean cyclone season

The 1971–72 Australian region cyclone season was a very active tropical cyclone season.

== Systems ==
=== Tropical Cyclone Rhoda ===
- Category 2 tropical cyclone (Australian scale)
- Tropical storm (SSHWS)
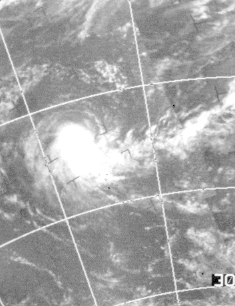
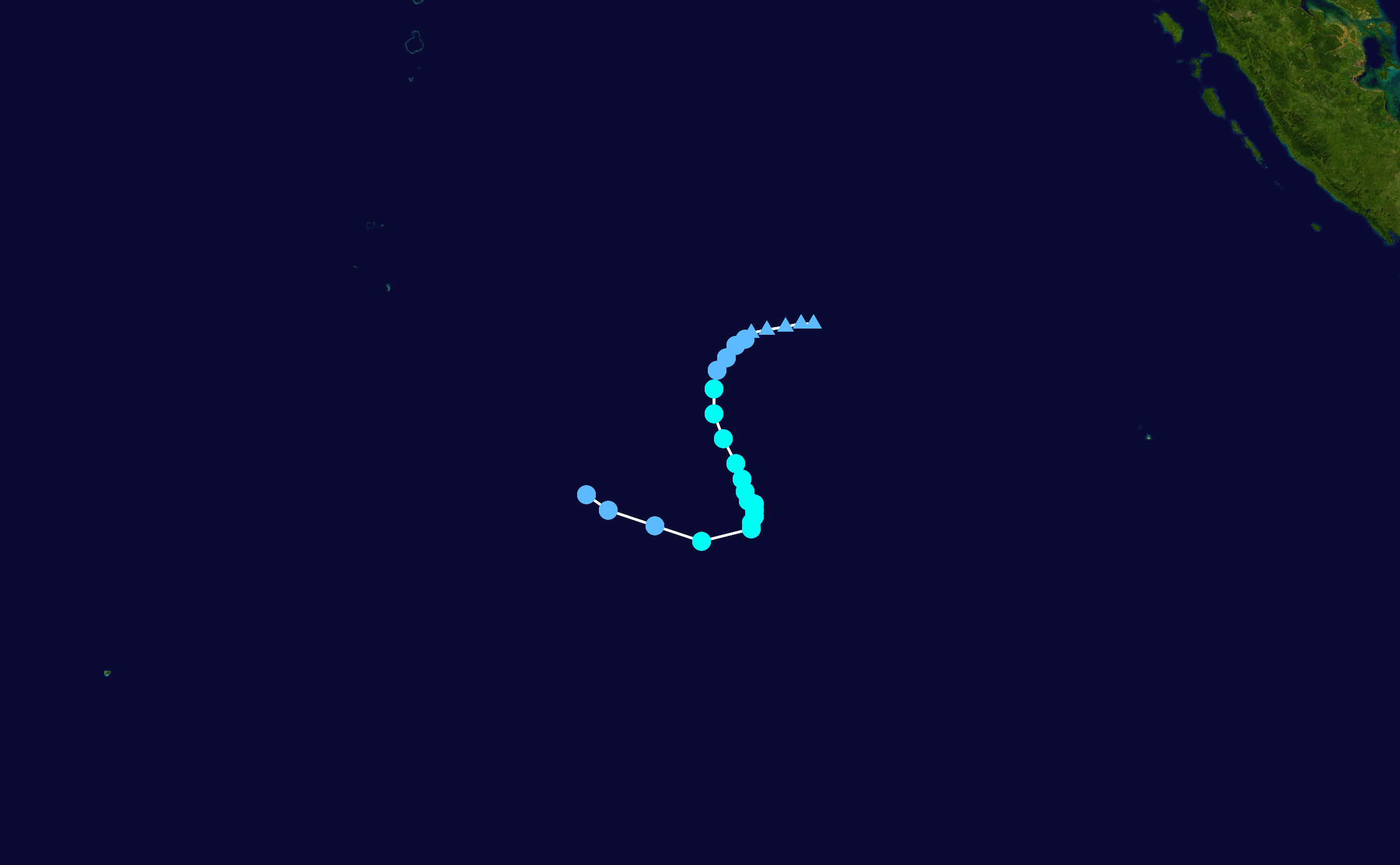
- Duration: 20 October – 26 October
- Peak intensity: 110 km/h (70 mph) (10-min); 980 hPa (mbar)

Tropical Cyclone Rhoda existed from October 20 to October 26.

=== Tropical Low Kitty ===
- Tropical low (Australian scale)
- Tropical depression (SSHWS)
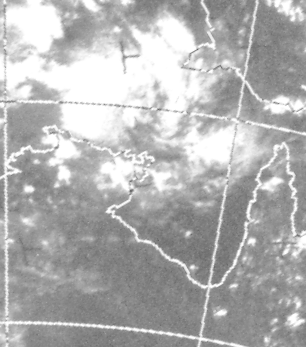
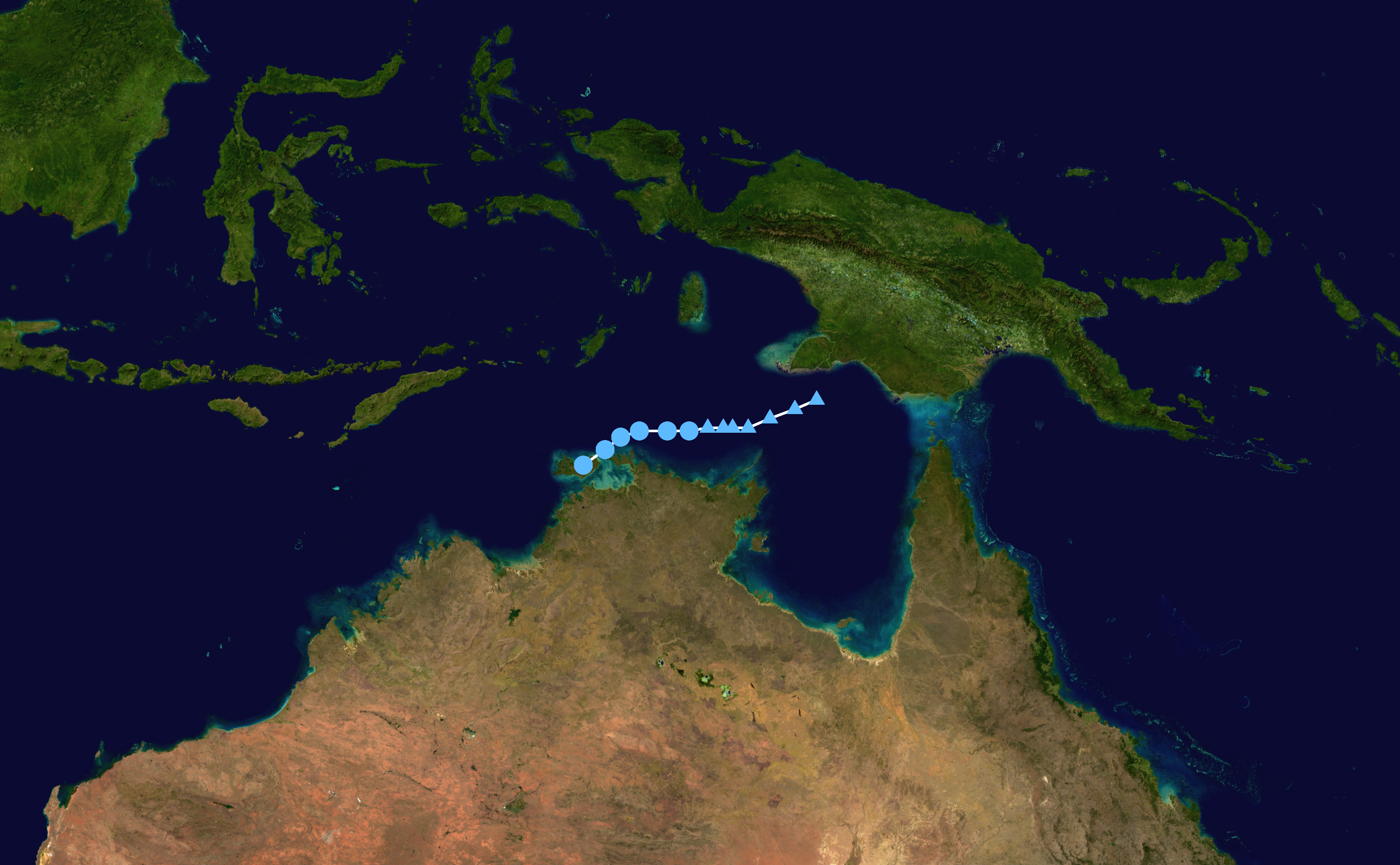
- Duration: 2 December – 5 December
- Peak intensity: 55 km/h (35 mph) (10-min); 1000 hPa (mbar)

Tropical Low Kitty existed from 2 to 5 December 1971 in the Arafura Sea.

=== Severe Tropical Cyclone Sally ===
- Category 4 severe tropical cyclone (Australian scale)
- Category 3 tropical cyclone (SSHWS)
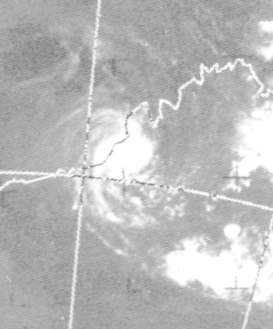
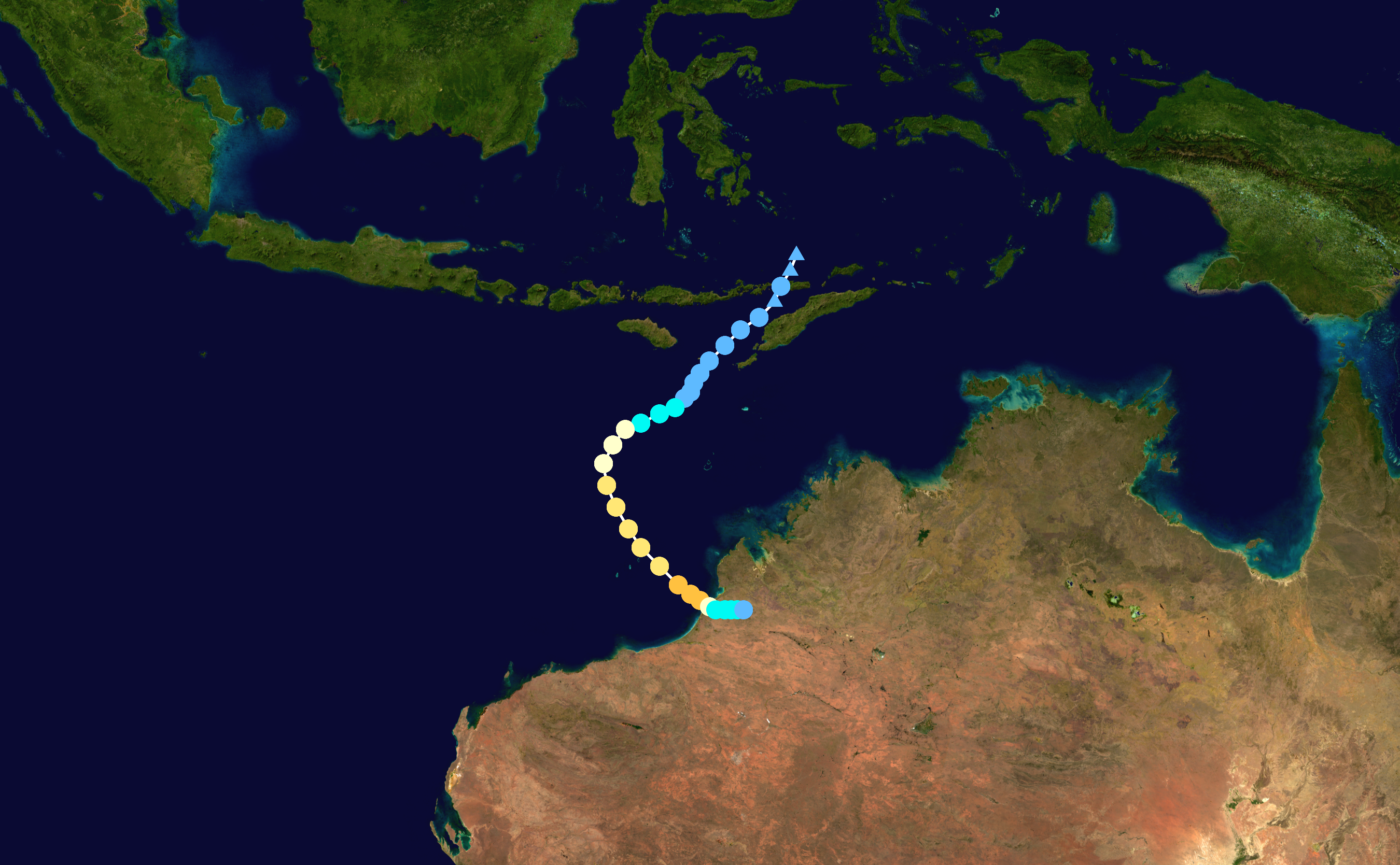
- Duration: 3 December – 11 December
- Peak intensity: 165 km/h (105 mph) (10-min); 950 hPa (mbar)

Severe Tropical Cyclone Sally existed from 3 to 13 December and crossed coast near Broome, Western Australia.

=== Severe Tropical Cyclone Althea ===
- Category 4 severe tropical cyclone (Australian scale)
- Category 2 tropical cyclone (SSHWS)
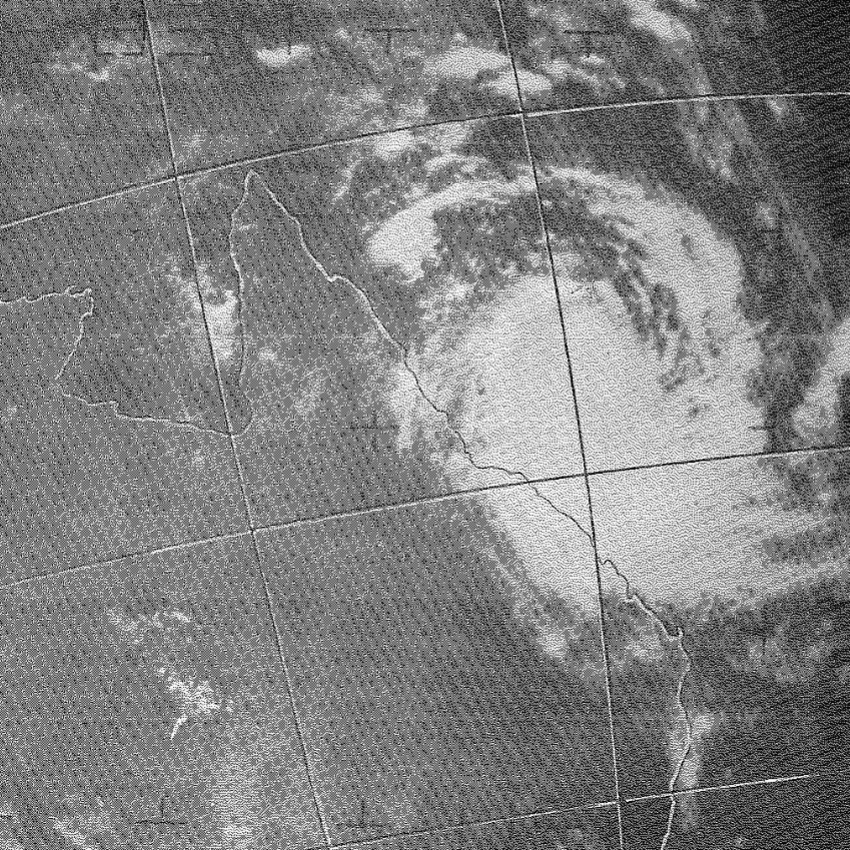
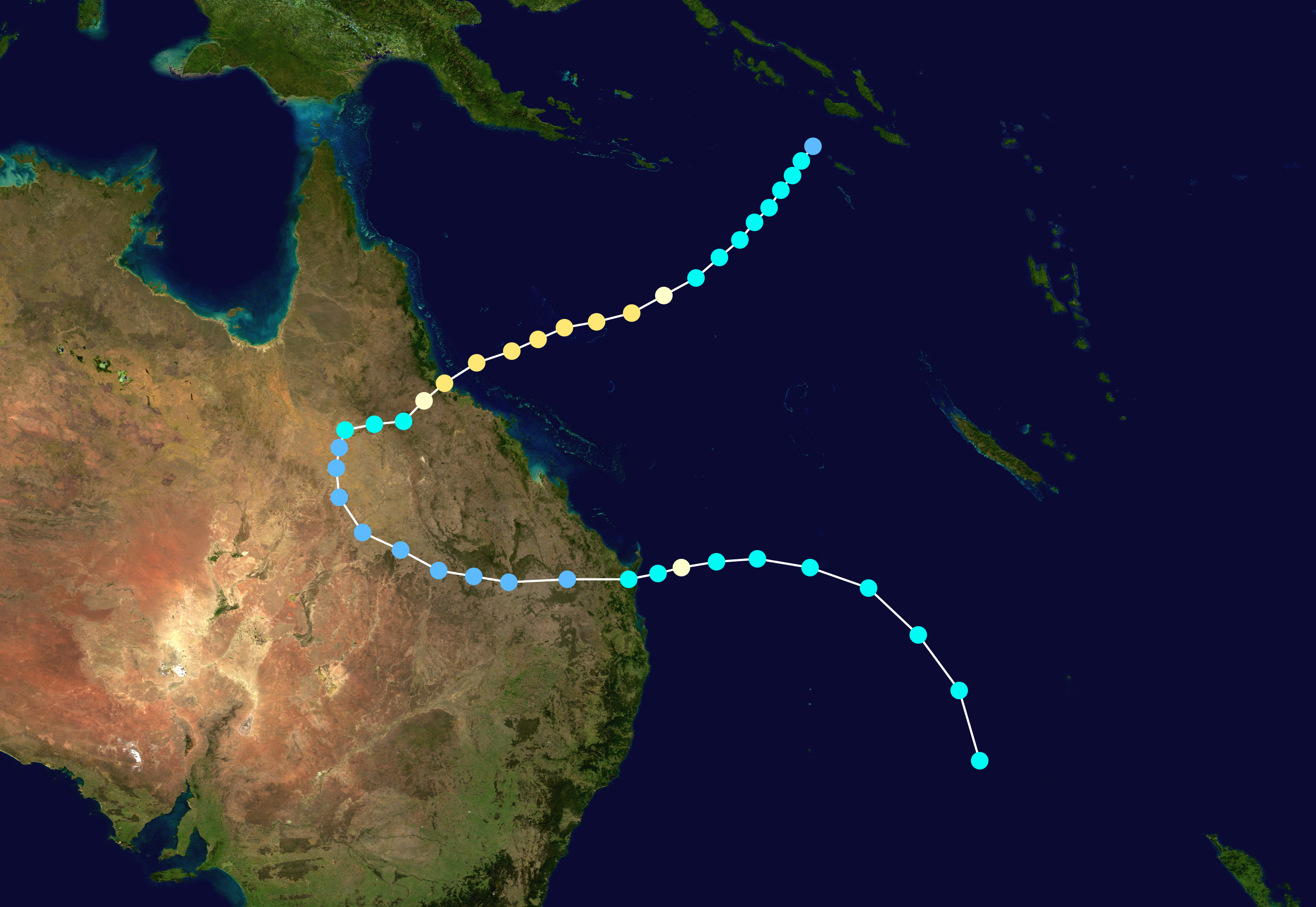
- Duration: 19 December – 29 December
- Peak intensity: 165 km/h (105 mph) (10-min); 952 hPa (mbar)

Tropical Cyclone Althea was a Category 4 cyclone when it hit the coast some 50 km north of Magnetic Island and Townsville in North Queensland on 24 December. Althea produced peak gust wind speeds between 123 and 145 miles per hour (197 and 233 km/h). Three people died and property damage was estimated at A$115 million loss (1990 value). On Magnetic Island 90% of the houses were damaged or destroyed. In Townsville houses were lifted from their foundations and most trees stripped of foliage. Althea was also notable at the time, as it had struck a major city.

Although there was a dangerous storm surge associated with Tropical Cyclone Althea (between 2.8 and 3.6 metres) little flooding occurred because the cyclone made landfall on a low tide. However, the combination of storm surge and wave action demolished The Strand sea wall and houses in low-lying areas were inundated with up to 0.6 metres of water.

=== Tropical Cyclone Bronwyn ===
- Category 1 tropical cyclone (Australian scale)
- Tropical storm (SSHWS)
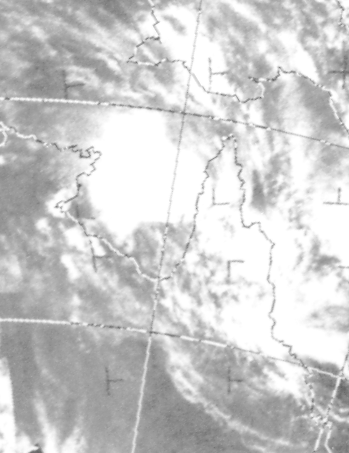
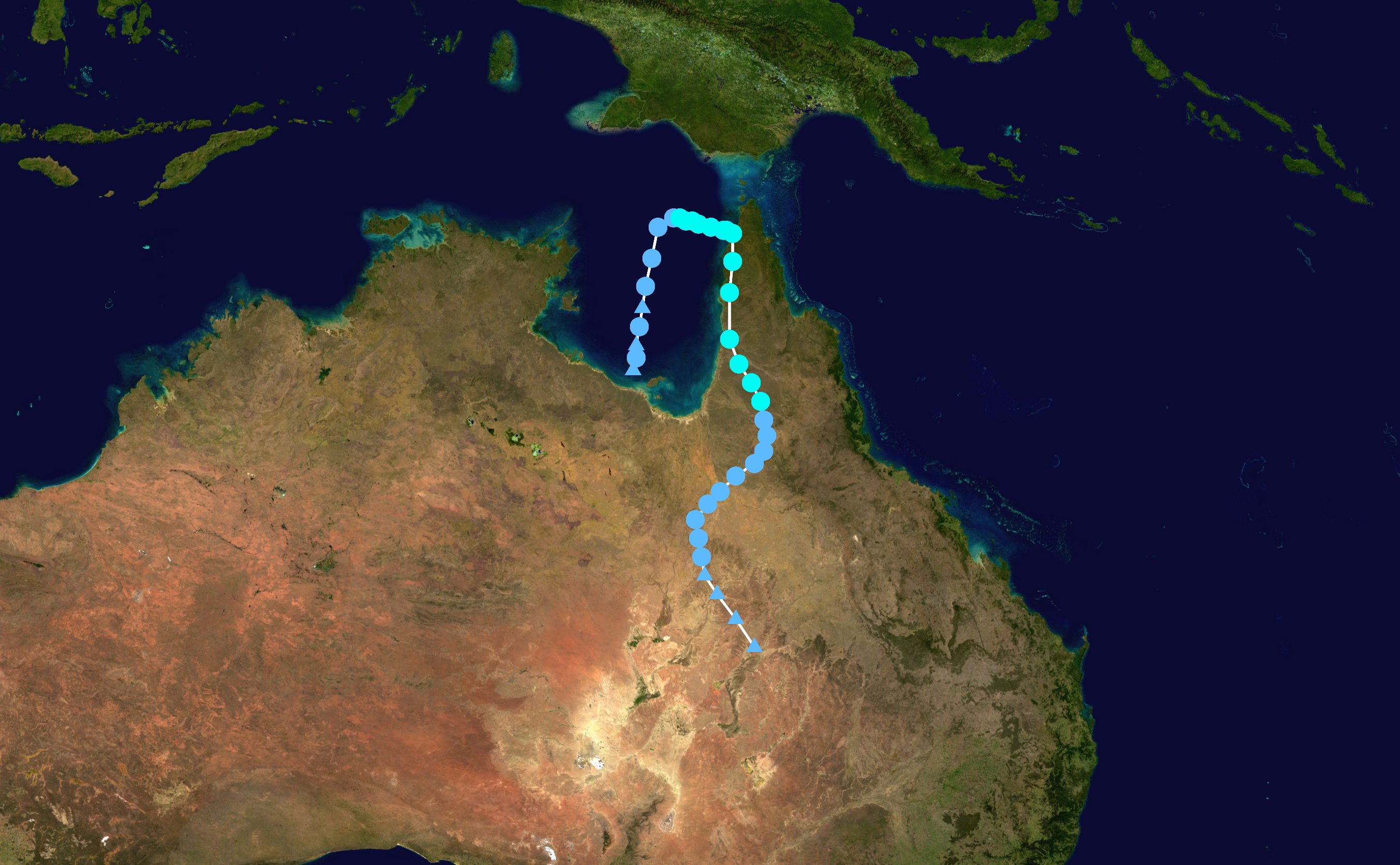
- Duration: 2 January – 9 January
- Peak intensity: 75 km/h (45 mph) (10-min); 993 hPa (mbar)

Bronwyn formed in the Gulf of Carpentaria and made landfall in Queensland on 7 January north of Weipa. Half of Queensland received more than 50 mm (2.0 in) of rain, with Paluma, Queensland receiving 1,270 mm (50 in) in 48 hours. Serious flooding occurred during the storm. The Burdekin River flooded Ayr and Home Hill.

=== Severe Tropical Cyclone Carlotta ===
- Category 3 severe tropical cyclone (Australian scale)
- Category 1 tropical cyclone (SSHWS)
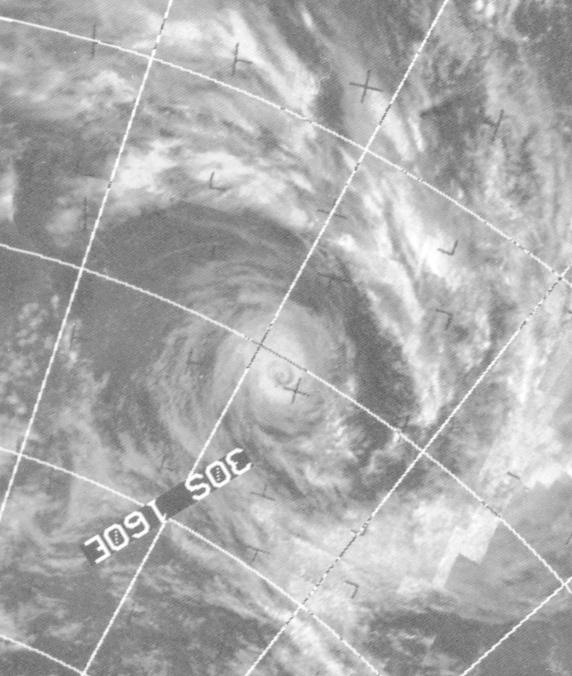
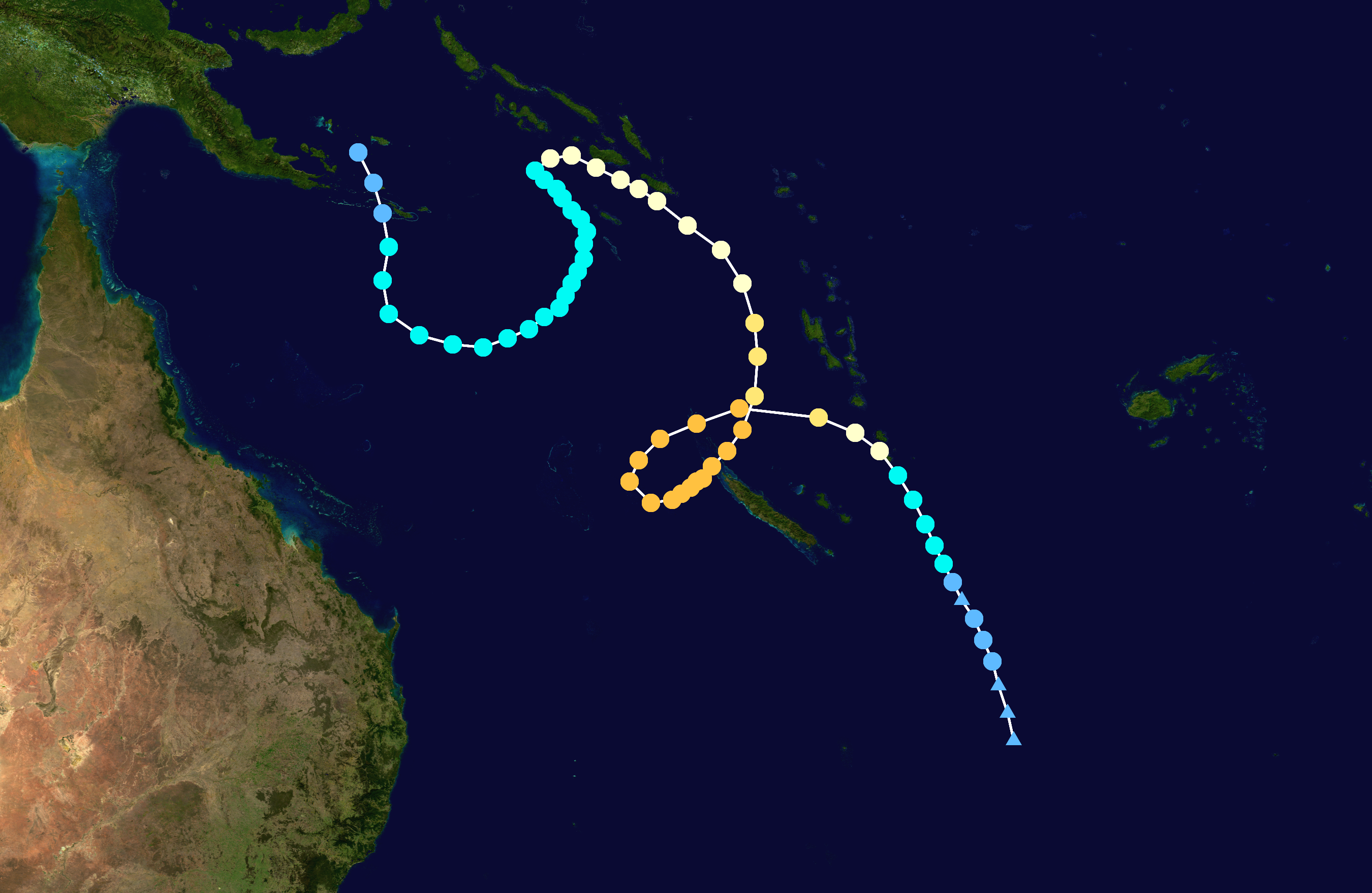
- Duration: January 5 – January 11 (Crossed 160°E)
- Peak intensity: 120 km/h (75 mph) (10-min); 976 hPa (mbar)

Severe Tropical Storm Carlotta existed from 5 to 11 January well off Queensland.

=== Severe Tropical Cyclone Wendy ===
- Category 3 severe tropical cyclone (Australian scale)
- Category 1 tropical cyclone (SSHWS)
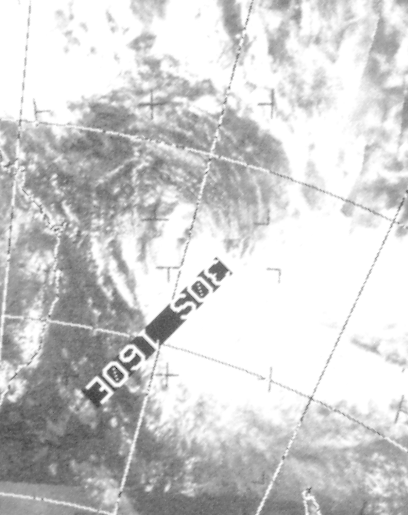
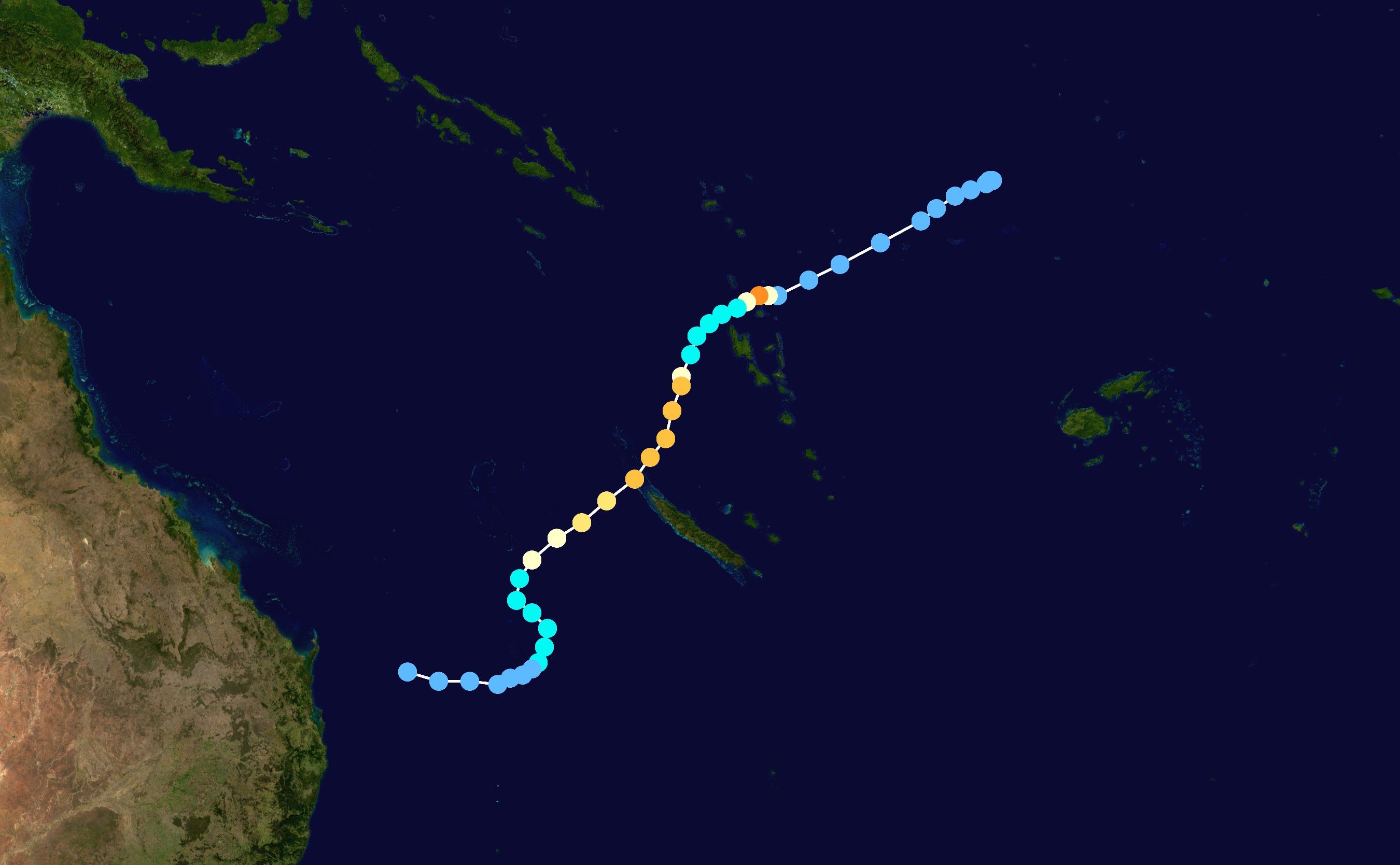
- Duration: 6 February(Crossed 160°E) – 9 February
- Peak intensity: 150 km/h (90 mph) (10-min); 976 hPa (mbar)

Severe Tropical Cyclone Wendy existed from 6 February to 9 February.

=== Severe Tropical Cyclone Daisy ===
- Category 3 severe tropical cyclone (Australian scale)
- Category 2 tropical cyclone (SSHWS)
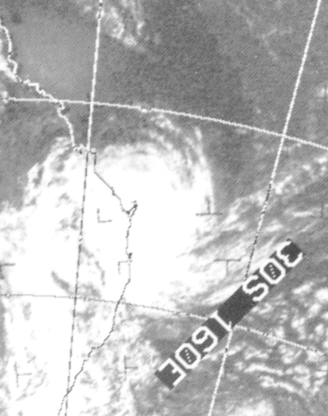
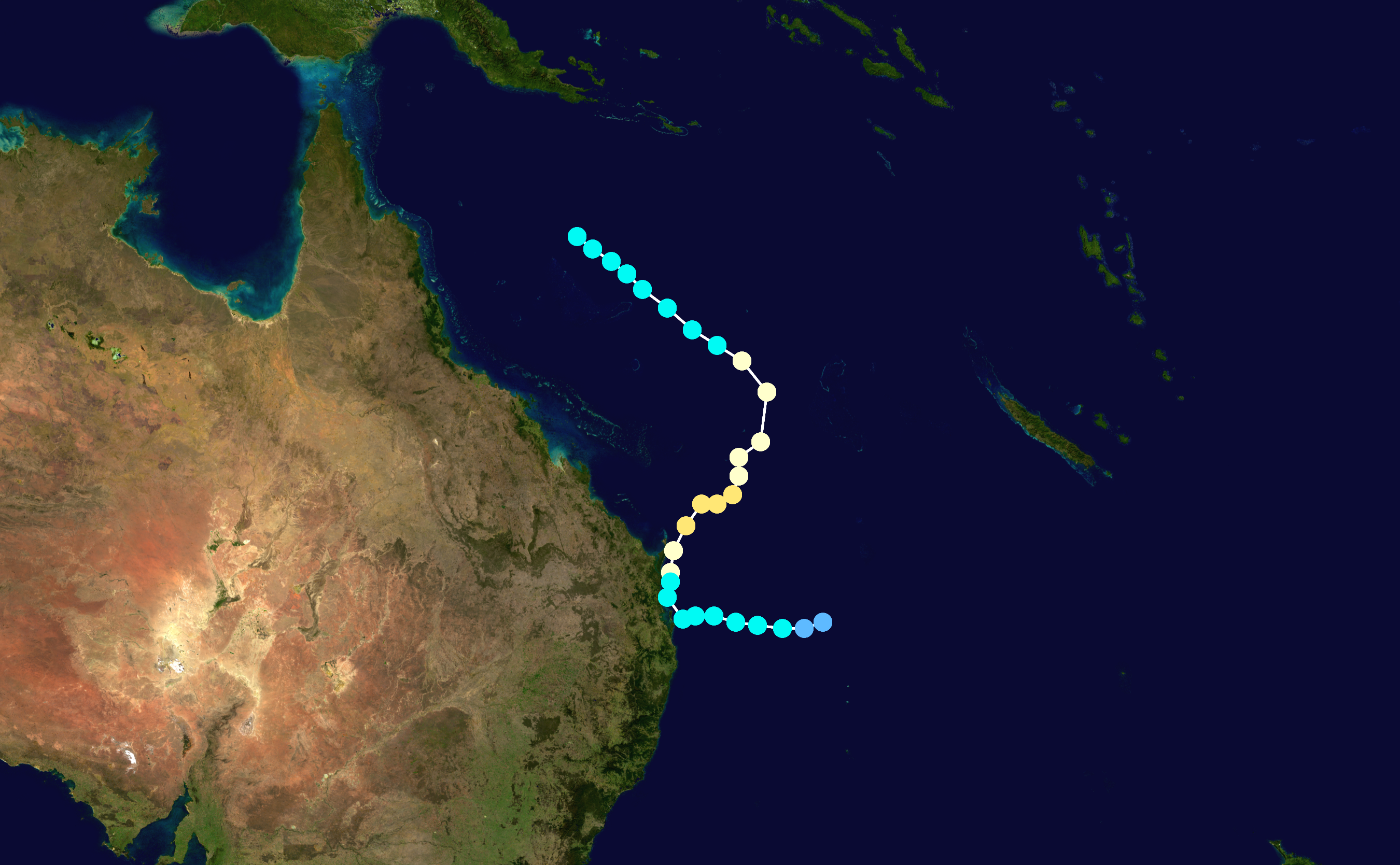
- Duration: 6 February – 14 February
- Peak intensity: 155 km/h (100 mph) (10-min); 959 hPa (mbar)

Severe Tropical Cyclone Daisy existed from 6 to 14 February off Queensland, and caused some flooding near Brisbane.

=== Severe Tropical Cyclone Tessie-Gigi ===
- Category 4 severe tropical cyclone (Australian scale)
- Category 1 tropical cyclone (SSHWS)
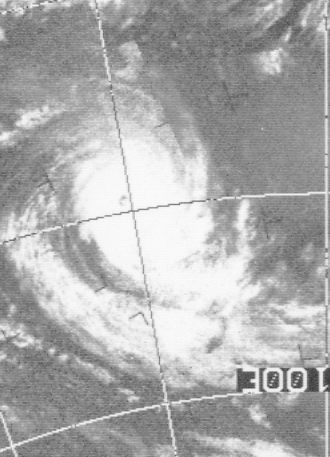
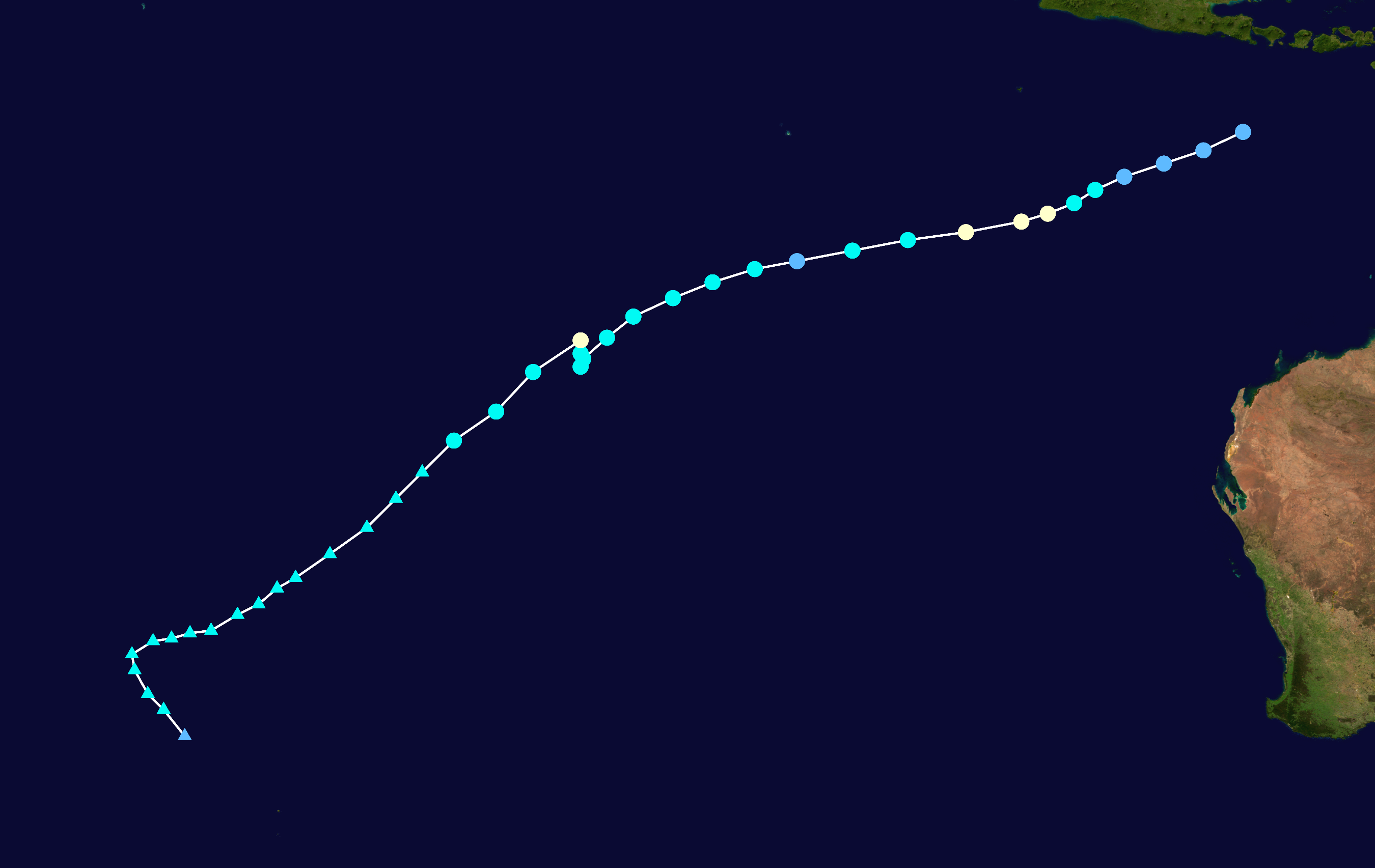
- Duration: 20 February – 27 February(Crossed 80°E)
- Peak intensity: 175 km/h (110 mph) (10-min); 950 hPa (mbar)

Severe Tropical Cyclone Tessie existed from 20 to 27 February in the central Indian Ocean

=== Severe Tropical Cyclone Vicky ===
- Category 3 severe tropical cyclone (Australian scale)
- Category 2 tropical cyclone (SSHWS)
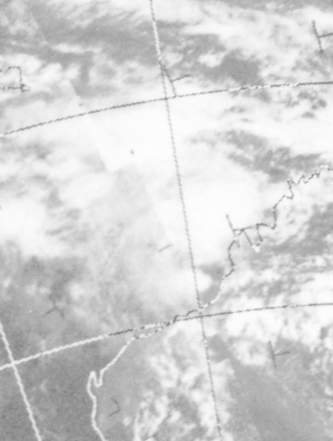
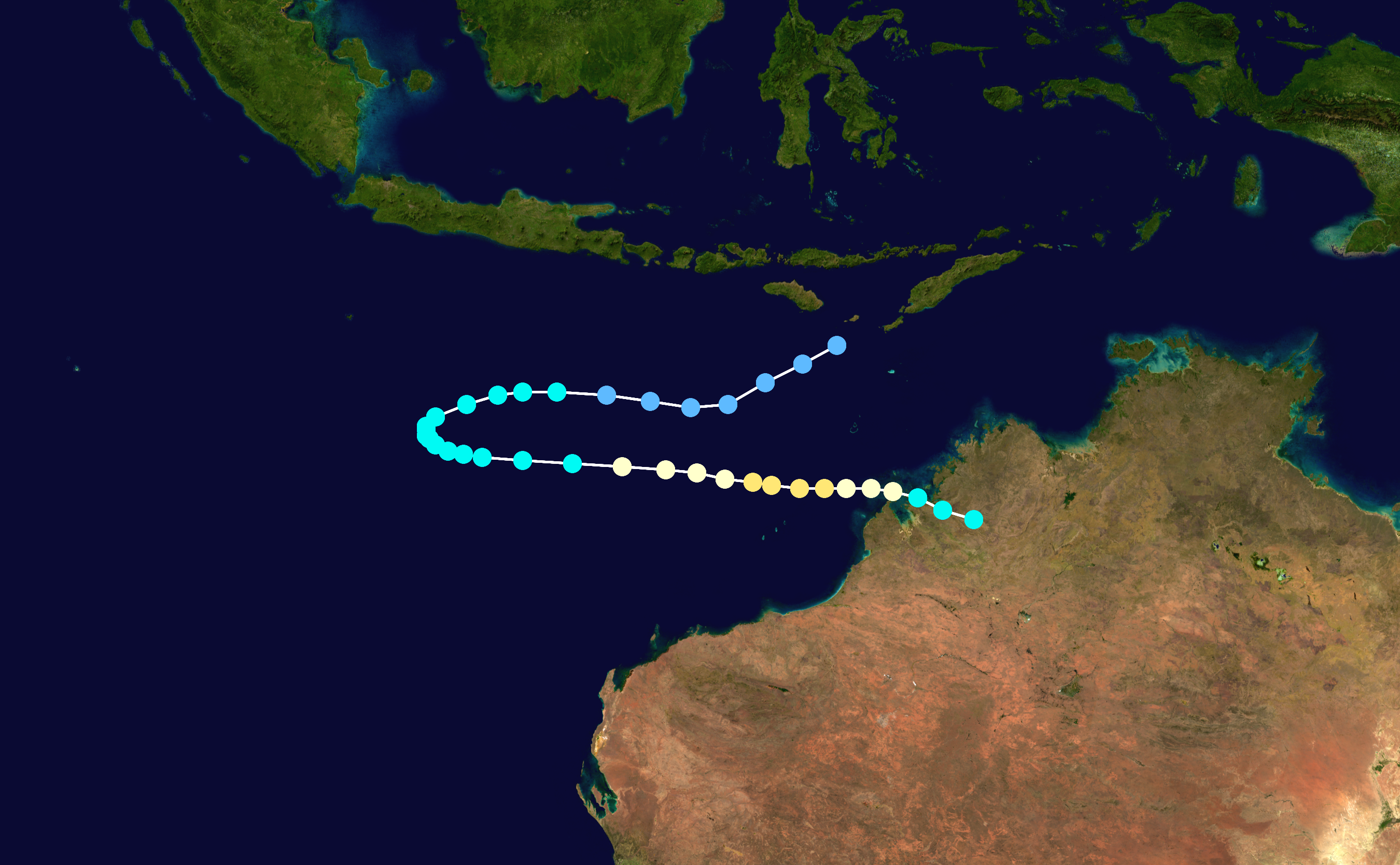
- Duration: 24 February – 4 March
- Peak intensity: 140 km/h (85 mph) (10-min); 961 hPa (mbar)

Severe Tropical Cyclone Vicky existed from 24 February to 4 March, and crossed Western Australian coast at Cockatoo Island.

=== Tropical Cyclone Angela ===
- Category 1 tropical cyclone (Australian scale)
- Tropical storm (SSHWS)
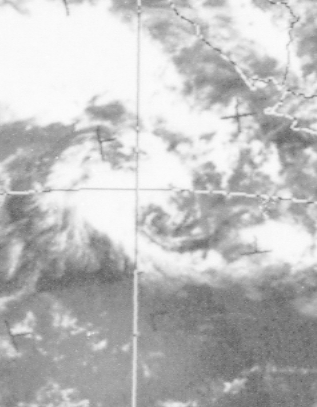
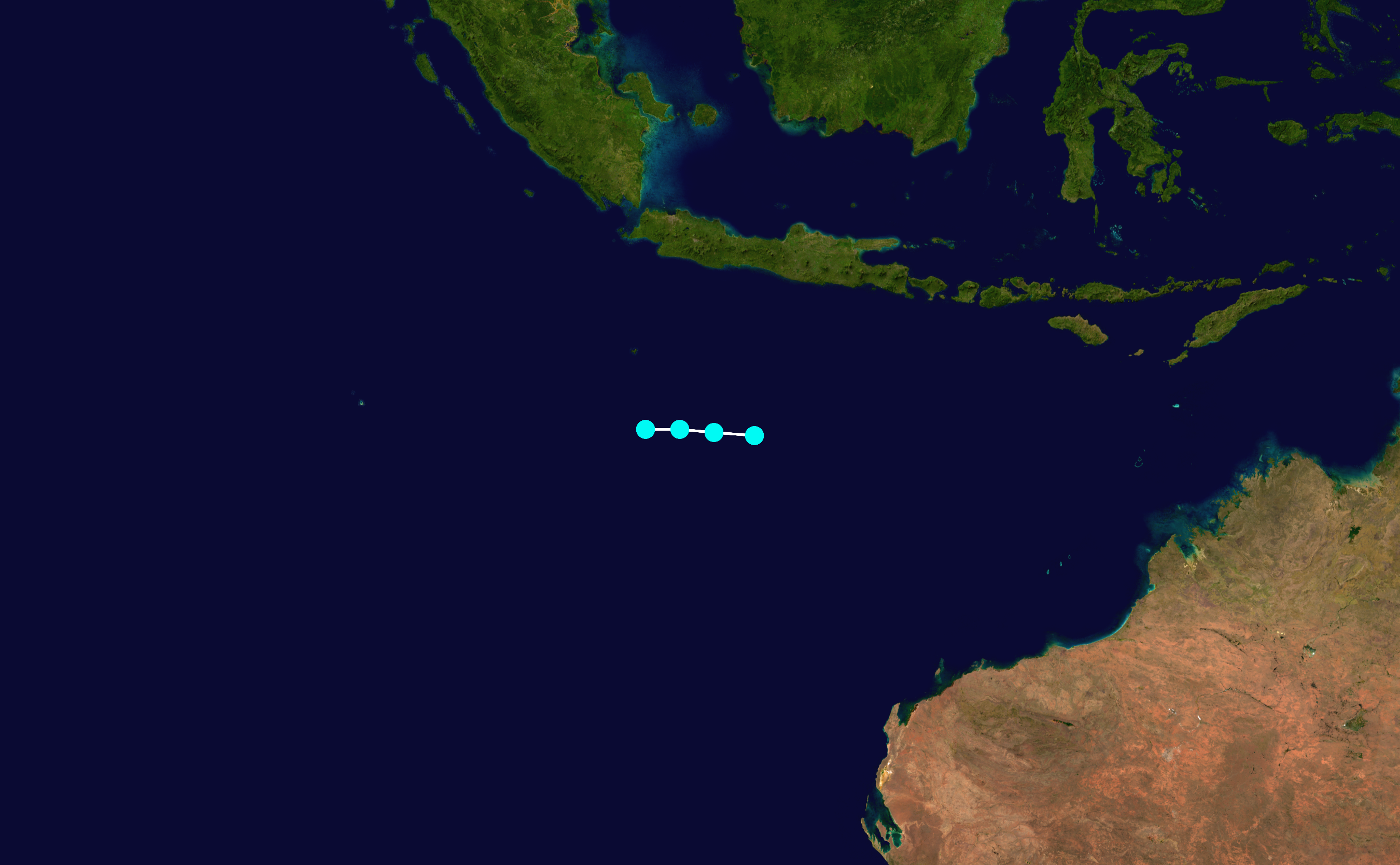
- Duration: 29 February – 3 March
- Peak intensity: 75 km/h (45 mph) (10-min); 994 hPa (mbar)

Tropical Cyclone Angela existed from 29 February to 3 March near Cocos Island and Christmas Island.

=== Tropical Cyclone Belinda ===
- Category 2 tropical cyclone (Australian scale)
- Tropical storm (SSHWS)
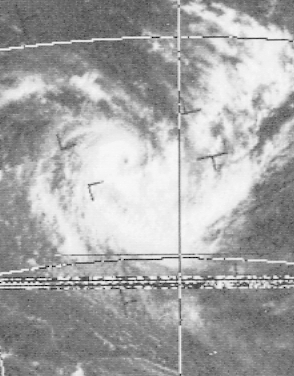
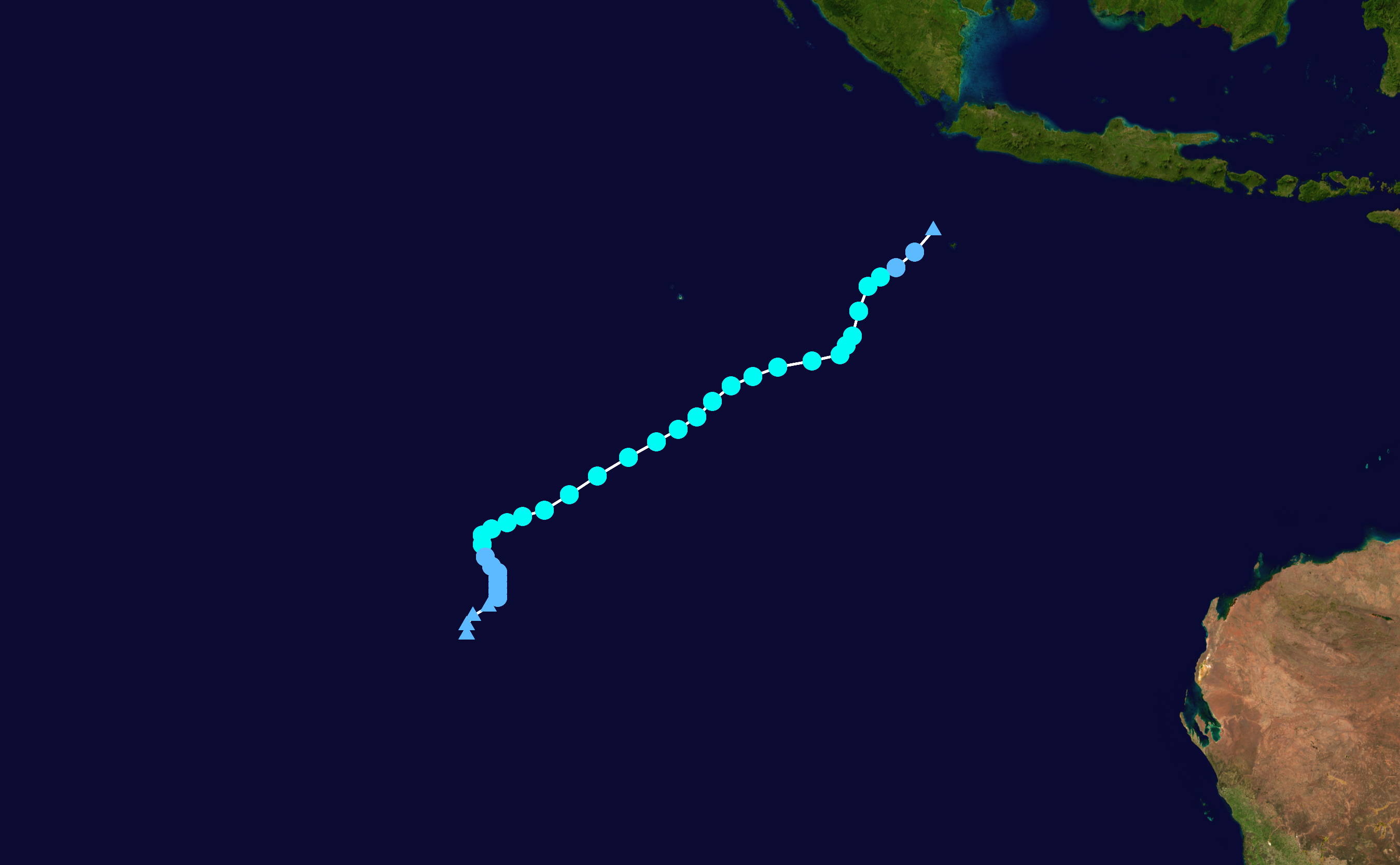
- Duration: 20 March – 29 March
- Peak intensity: 110 km/h (70 mph) (10-min); 980 hPa (mbar)

Severe Tropical Cyclone Belinda existed from 20 to 29 March near Christmas Island.

=== Severe Tropical Cyclone Emily ===
- Category 4 severe tropical cyclone (Australian scale)
- Category 3 tropical cyclone (SSHWS)
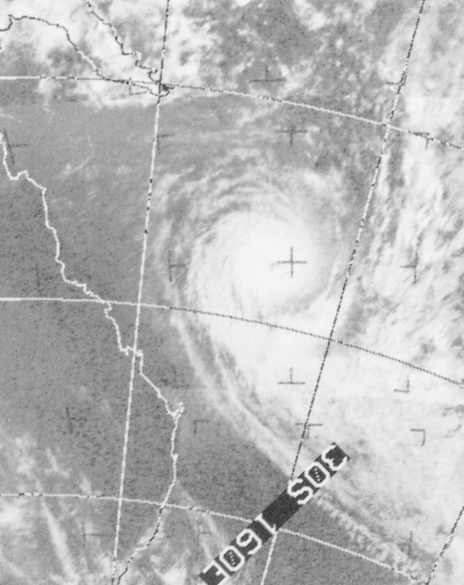
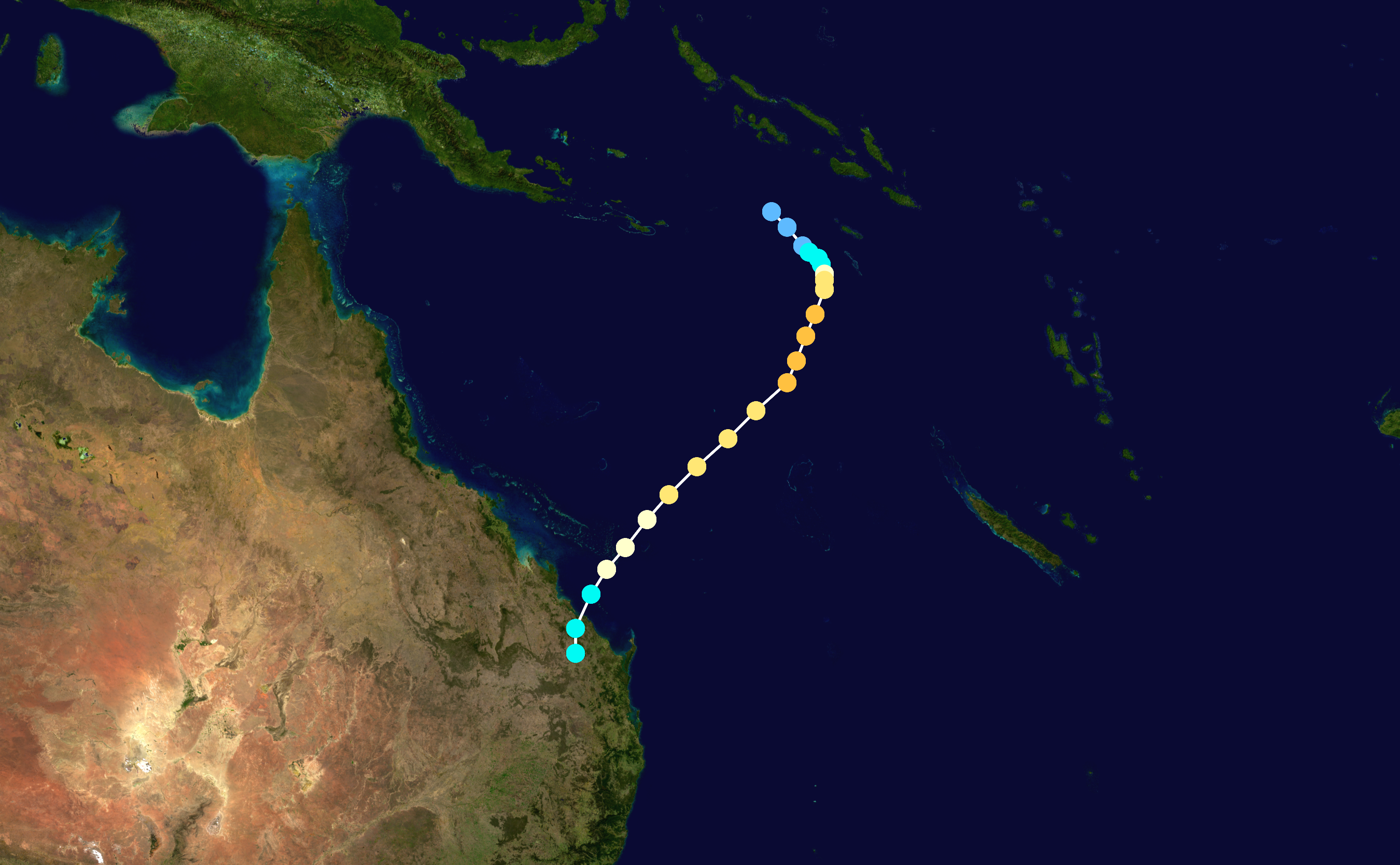
- Duration: 27 March – 2 April
- Peak intensity: 185 km/h (115 mph) (10-min); 942 hPa (mbar)

Severe Tropical Cyclone Emily existed from 27 March to 2 April off Queensland, and while it went through the ocean, eight lives were lost.

=== Severe Tropical Cyclone Carol ===
- Category 3 severe tropical cyclone (Australian scale)
- Category 1 tropical cyclone (SSHWS)
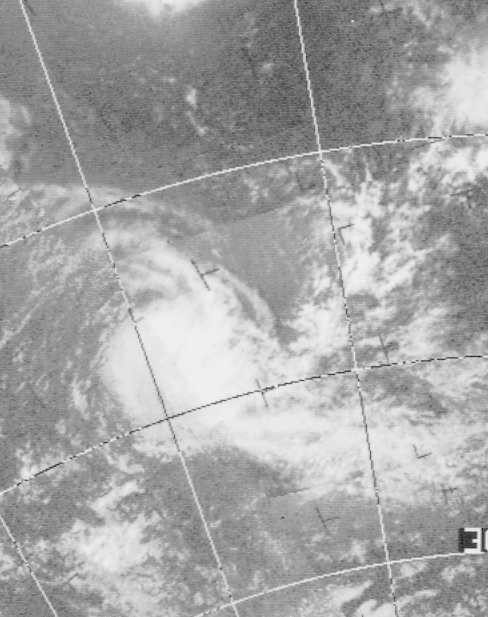
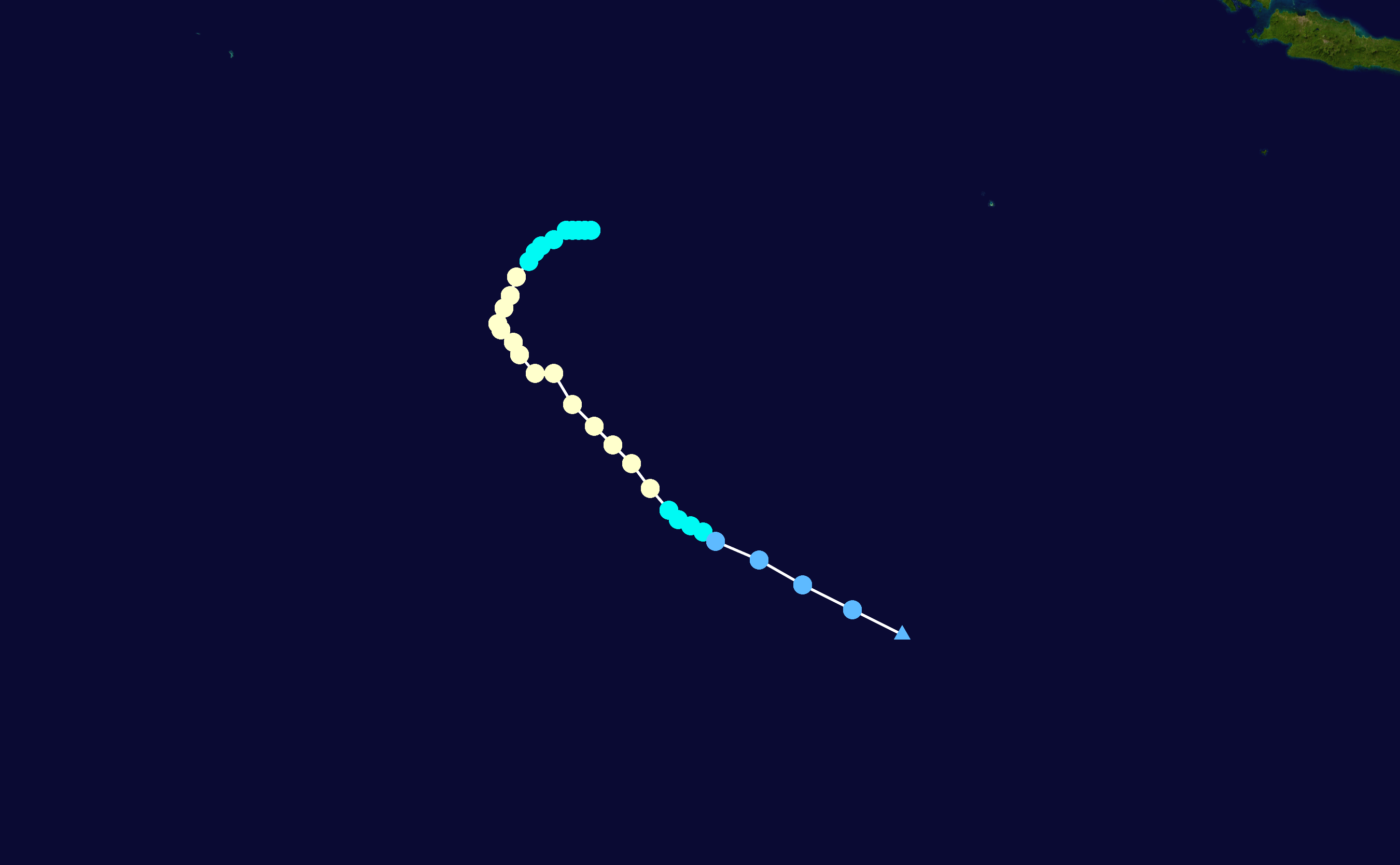
- Duration: 6 April – 14 April
- Peak intensity: 150 km/h (90 mph) (10-min); 965 hPa (mbar)

Severe Tropical Cyclone Carol existed from 6 to 14 April in the central Indian Ocean.

=== Tropical Cyclone Faith ===
- Category 1 tropical cyclone (Australian scale)
- Tropical storm (SSHWS)
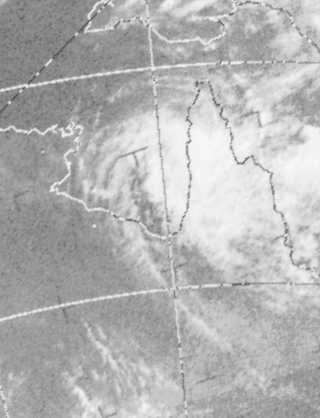
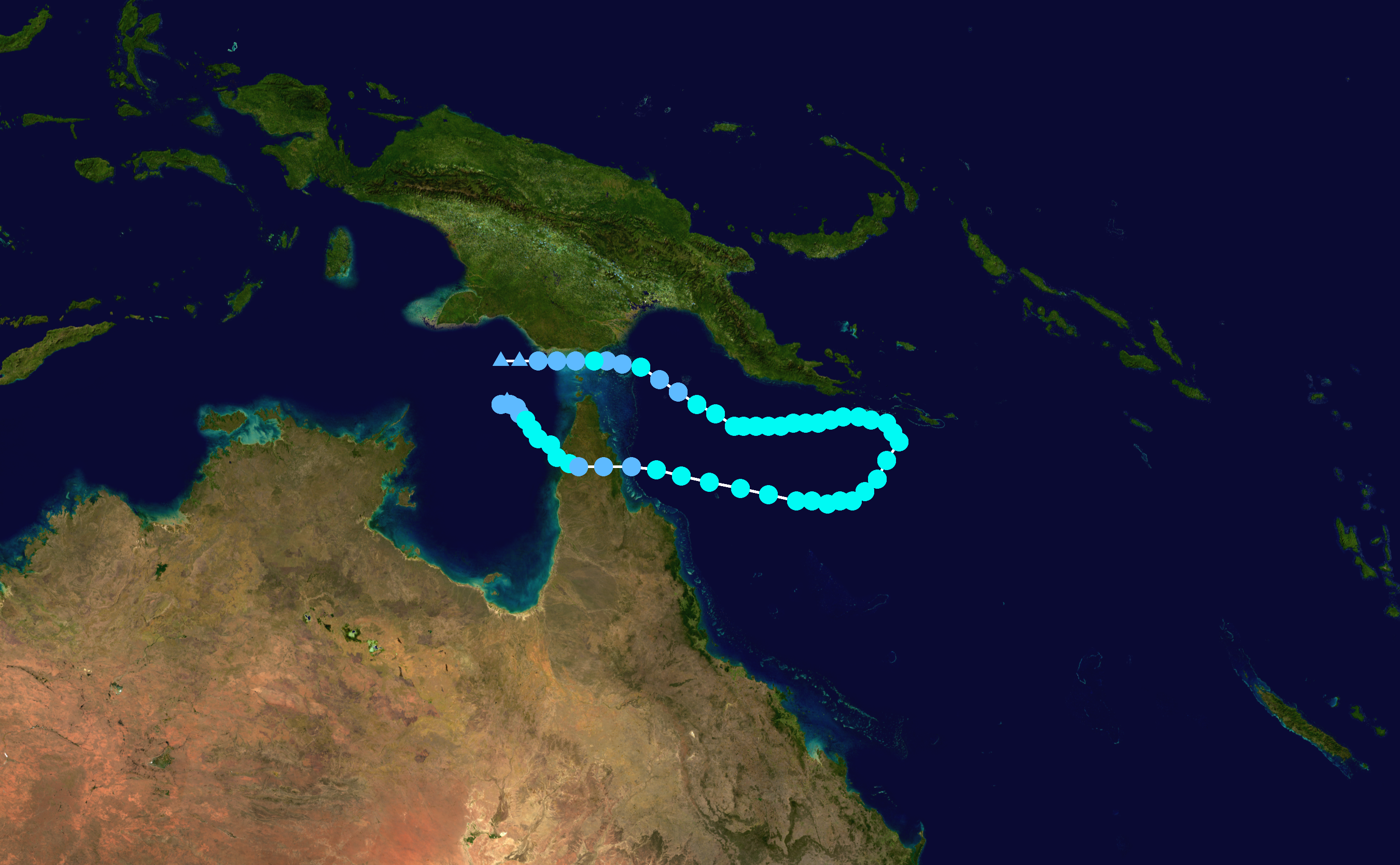
- Duration: April 10 – April 24
- Peak intensity: 85 km/h (50 mph) (10-min); 990 hPa (mbar)

Tropical Cyclone Faith existed from 11 to 23 April in the Torres Strait and the Coral Sea off Queensland.

=== Severe Tropical Cyclone Gail ===
- Category 4 severe tropical cyclone (Australian scale)
- Category 3 tropical cyclone (SSHWS)
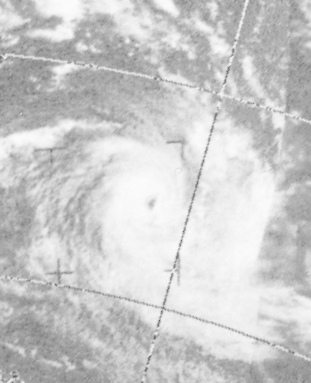
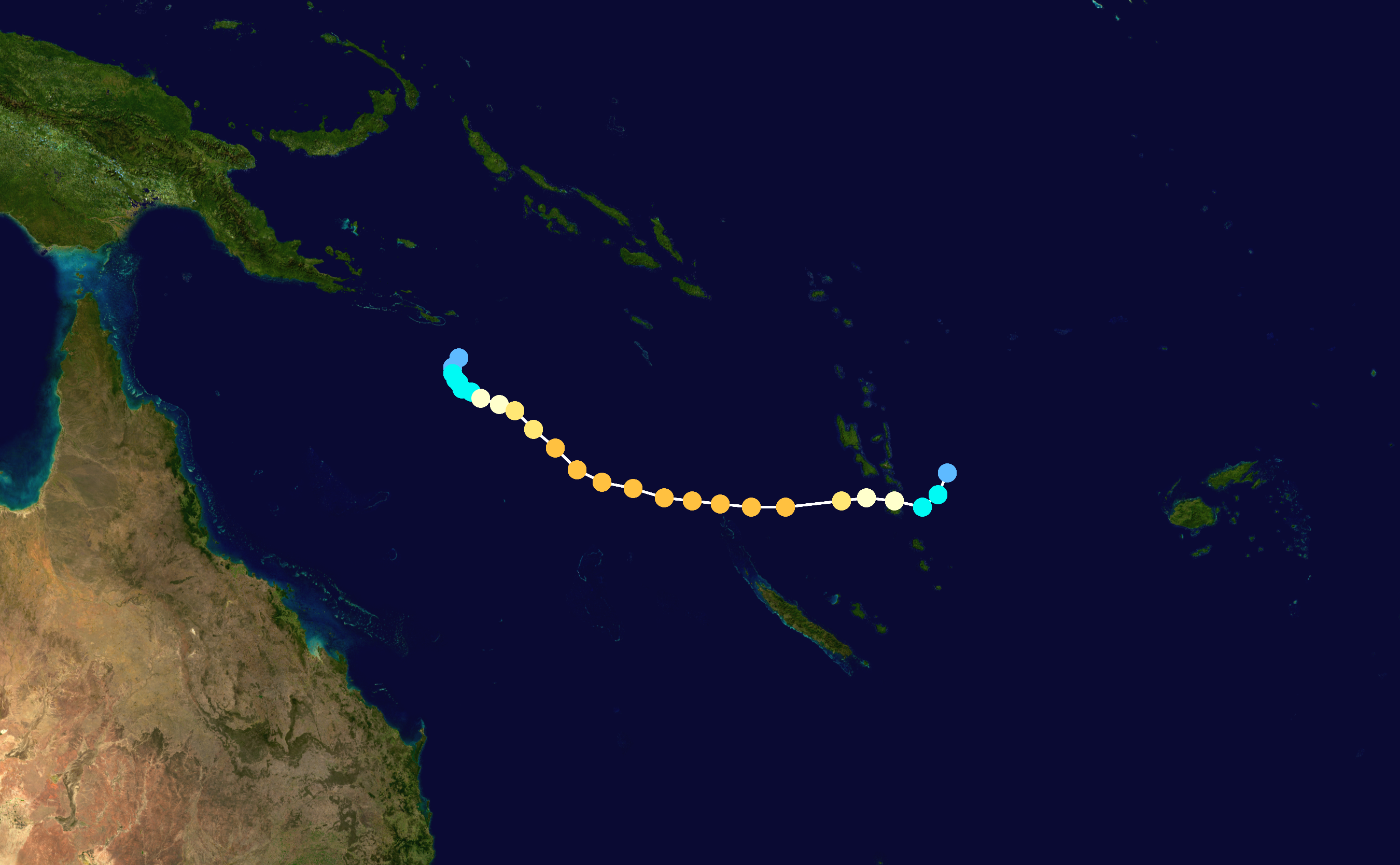
- Duration: 11 April – 14 April (Crossed 160°E)
- Peak intensity: 185 km/h (115 mph) (10-min); 945 hPa (mbar)

Severe Tropical Cyclone Gail existed from 11 to 14 April well off of Queensland.

=== Severe Tropical Cyclone Hannah ===
- Category 3 severe tropical cyclone (Australian scale)
- Category 1 tropical cyclone (SSHWS)
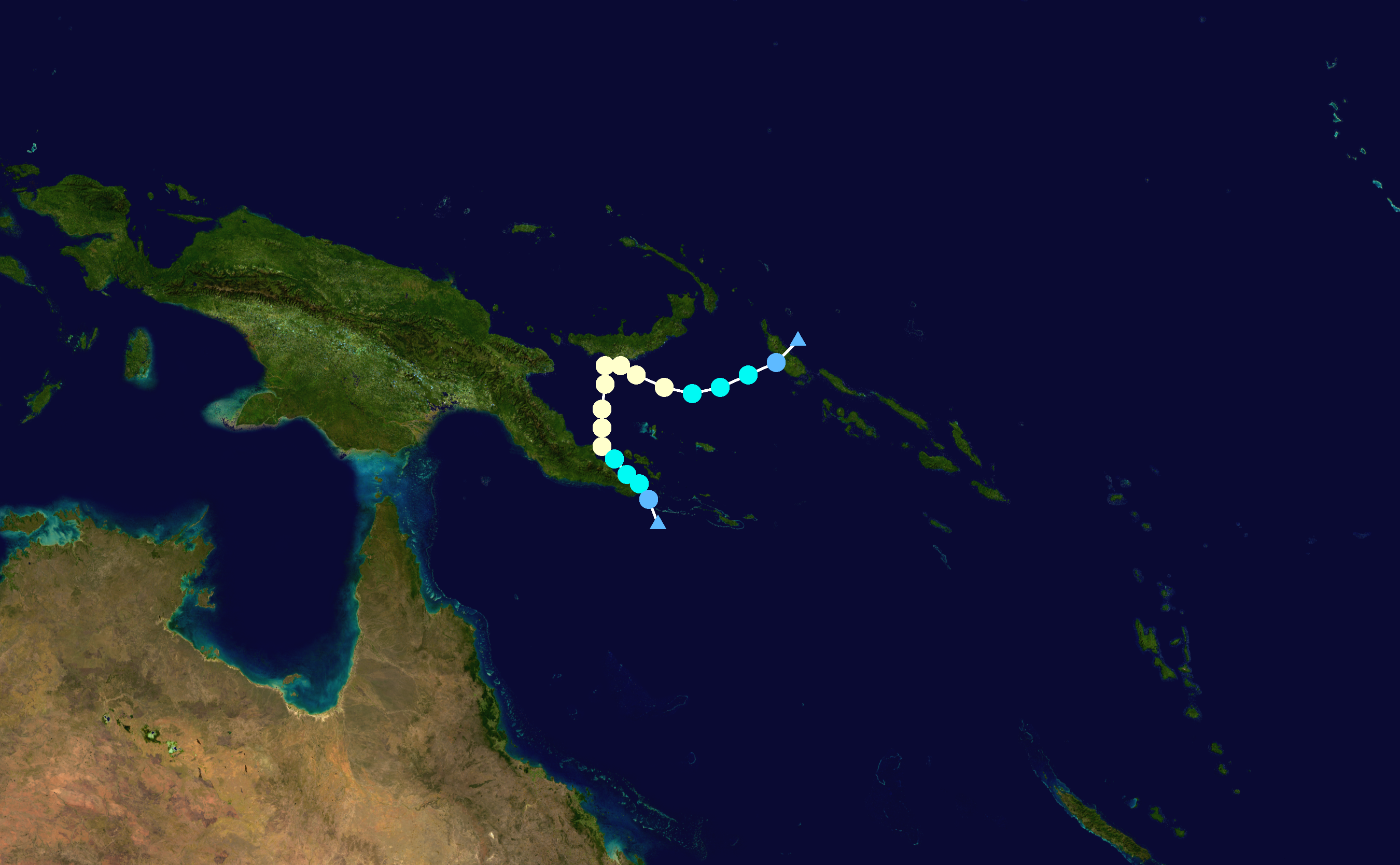
- Duration: 8 May – 11 May
- Peak intensity: 130 km/h (80 mph) (10-min); 970 hPa (mbar)

Severe Tropical Cyclone Hannah existed from 8 to 11 May near Papua New Guinea.

=== Severe Tropical Cyclone Ida ===
- Category 3 severe tropical cyclone (Australian scale)
- Category 1 tropical cyclone (SSHWS)
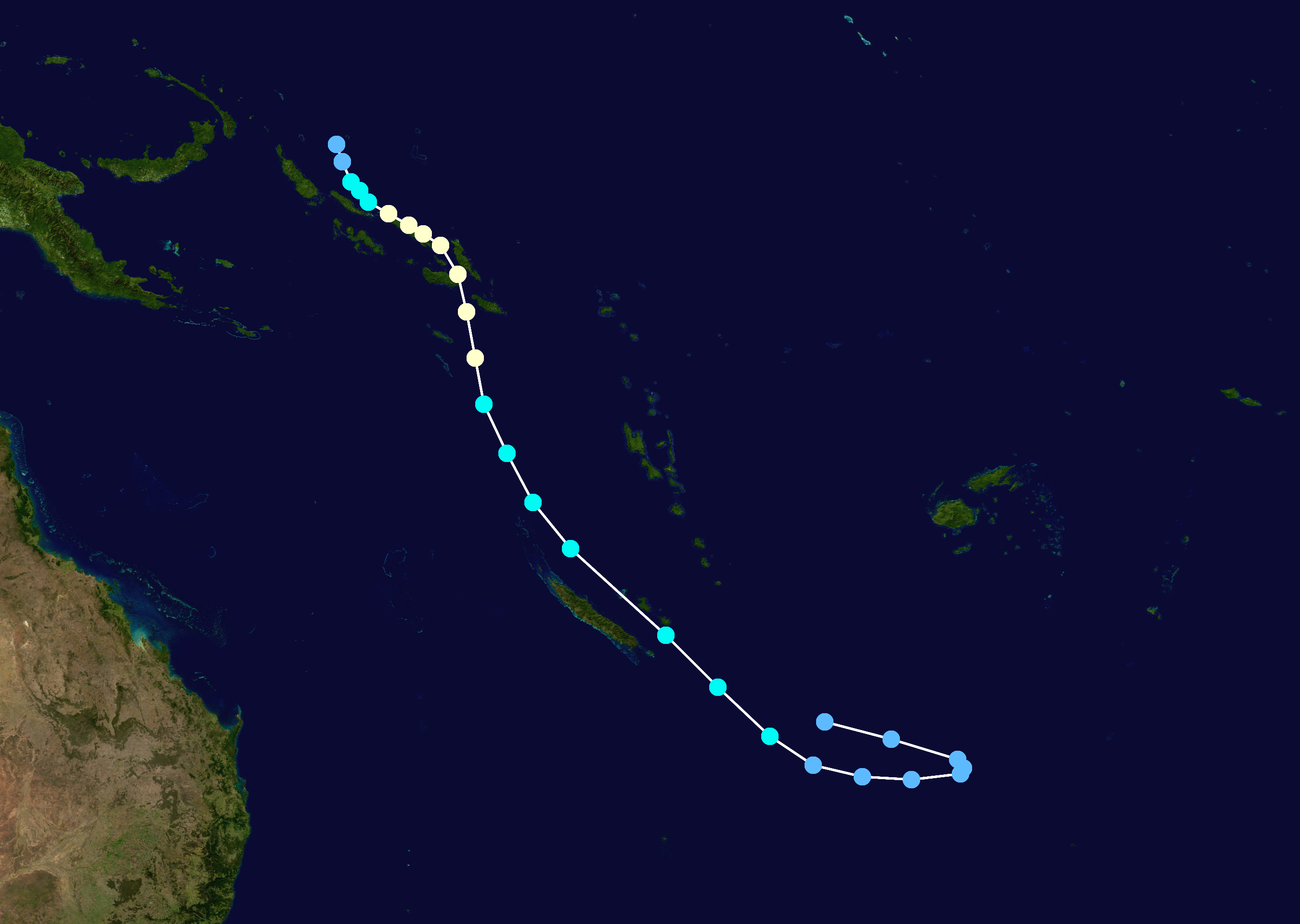
- Duration: 30 May – 1 June (Crossed 160°E)
- Peak intensity: 130 km/h (80 mph) (10-min); 970 hPa (mbar)

Severe Tropical Cyclone Ida existed from 30 May to 1 June near the Solomon Islands causing $70 million damage.

== See also ==
- Atlantic hurricane seasons: 1971, 1972
- Eastern Pacific hurricane seasons: 1971, 1972
- Western Pacific typhoon seasons: 1971, 1972
- North Indian Ocean cyclone seasons: 1971, 1972
