= List of storms named Fern =

The name Fern has been used for three tropical cyclones worldwide, two in the Atlantic Ocean, one in the Western North Pacific Ocean.

In the Atlantic Ocean:

- Hurricane Fern (1967) – a Category 1 hurricane that hit the state of Veracruz with minor damage.
- Hurricane Fern (1971) – a Category 1 hurricane second Atlantic tropical cyclone to make U.S. landfall that year produced heavy rainfall across Louisiana and Texas.

In the Western Pacific Ocean:

- Tropical Storm Fern (1996) (T9629, 42W) – a damaging storm that struck Yap in the 1996

In addition, the January 2026 North American winter storm has been unofficially referred to as Winter Storm Fern by The Weather Channel.
