= List of storms named Francene =

The name Francene, or the alternate spelling of the name, Francine, has been used for five tropical cyclones worldwide: one in the Atlantic Ocean, three in the Eastern North Pacific Ocean, and one in the South-West Indian Ocean.

In the Atlantic:

- Hurricane Francine (2024) – a Category 2 hurricane that made landfall in Louisiana

In the Eastern Pacific:

- Tropical Storm Francene (1967) – paralleled the western coast of Mexico
- Hurricane Francene (1971) – Category 3 hurricane that moved out to sea
- Tropical Storm Francene (1975) – did not affect land

In the South-West Indian:

- Tropical Depression Francine (1966) – did not affect land
