= List of storms named Frederic =

The name Frederic has been used for three tropical cyclones worldwide, one in the Atlantic Ocean and two in the Australian region.

In the Atlantic:

- Hurricane Frederic (1979) – a devastating Category 4 hurricane that carved a path of destruction from the Lesser Antilles to Quebec, devastating areas of the United States Gulf Coast in particular.

The name Frederic was retired in the North Atlantic after the 1979 season, and was replaced by Fabian for the 1985 season.

In the Australian region:

- Cyclone Frederic (1988) – a Category 1 tropical cyclone, mostly stayed at sea.
- Cyclone Frederic (1999) – a category 5 tropical cyclone in the South Indian Ocean, remained mostly at sea.
