= 1972 Atlantic hurricane season =

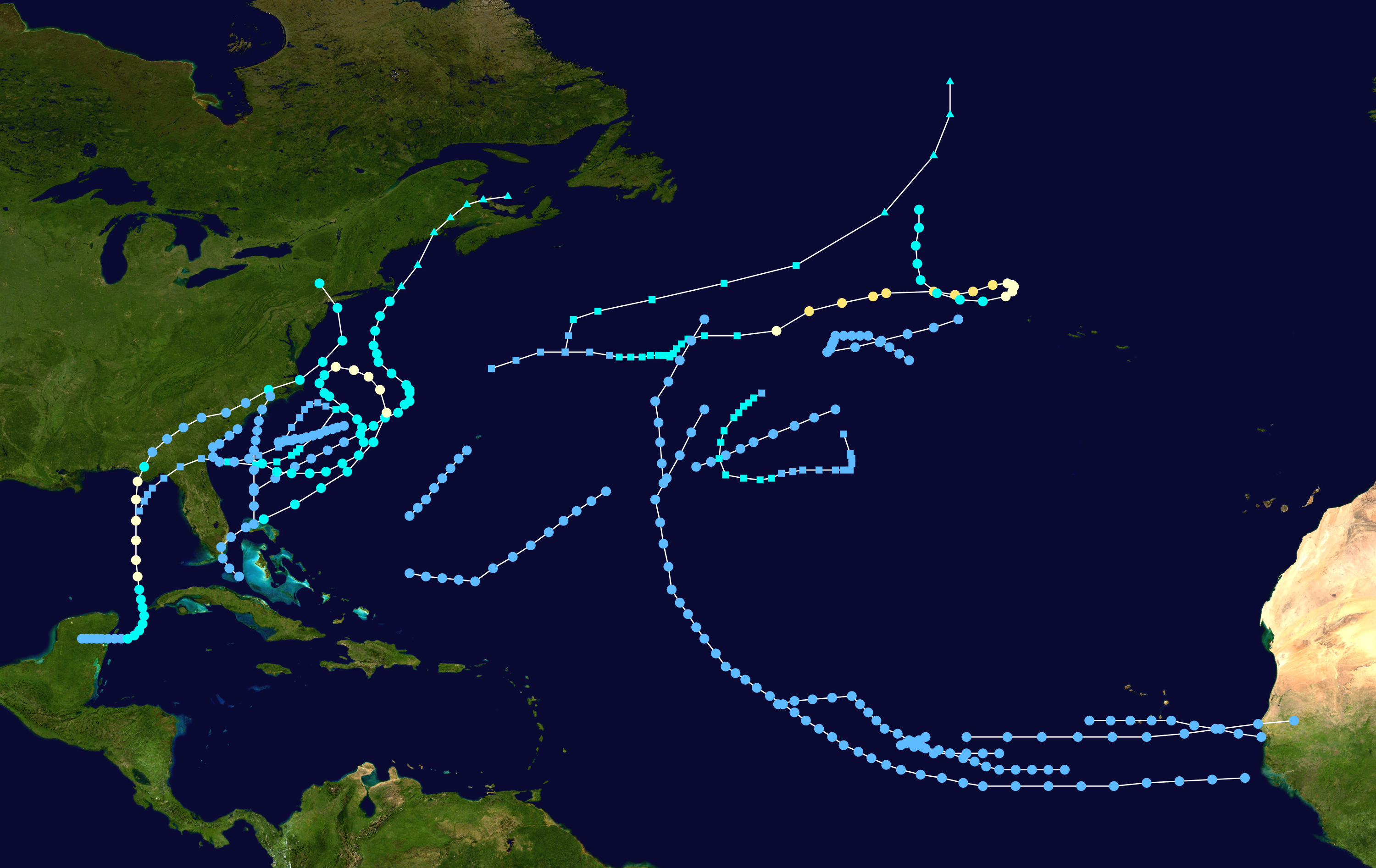
- Season summary map

Seasonal boundaries
- First system formed: May 23, 1972
- Last system dissipated: November 7, 1972

Strongest storm
- Name: Betty
  - Maximum winds: 90 mph (150 km/h) (1-minute sustained)
  - Lowest pressure: 976 mbar (hPa; 28.82 inHg)

Seasonal statistics
- Total depressions: 17
- Total storms: 12
- Hurricanes: 2 (record low in the satellite era, tied with 1982 and 2013)
- Major hurricanes (Cat. 3+): 0
- Total fatalities: 137 total
- Total damage: $2.1 billion (1972 USD)

Related articles
- Timeline of the 1972 Atlantic hurricane season; 1972 Pacific hurricane season; 1972 Pacific typhoon season; 1972 North Indian Ocean cyclone season

The 1972 Atlantic hurricane season was a significantly below average season. Although it featured 12 tropical or subtropical storms, only two strengthened into hurricanes and neither exceeded Category 1 intensity (only 2013 has matched such in the reconnaissance era). It officially began on June 1, 1972, and lasted until November 30, 1972. These dates conventionally delimit the period of each year when most tropical cyclones form in the Atlantic basin. The first storm, Subtropical Storm Alpha, developed on May 23 off the Southeast United States and struck Florida, causing minor damage and two fatalities.

The most significant storm of the season was Hurricane Agnes, which at the time was the costliest United States hurricane, until Frederic in 1979. After brushing the western tip of Cuba, the hurricane made landfall on the Florida Panhandle. It caused at least $2.1 billion (1972 USD) (Note: All damage figures are in 1972 United States dollars, unless otherwise noted) in damage and 131 fatalities, mostly from inland flooding in Pennsylvania and New York. The strongest hurricane of the season was Betty, which reached peak winds of 90 mph (150 km/h) while west of the Azores. Tropical Storm Carrie passed just offshore of Massachusetts, causing heavy rainfall and resulting in four fatalities, but leaving only $1.78 million in damage. The remaining tropical systems caused no significant effects on land.

Due to a strong El Niño only two systems strengthened into hurricanes, none of which intensified into major hurricanes. (Note: A major hurricane is a storm that ranks as Category 3 or higher on the Saffir–Simpson hurricane wind scale.) This was the first season to name subtropical storms in real time, and did so using the Phonetic Alphabet. Collectively, the storms of the 1972 Atlantic hurricane season resulted in 137 deaths and over $2.1 billion in damage.

== Season summary ==
The Atlantic hurricane season officially began on June 1, 1972, although Subtropical Storm Alpha formed on May 23. A total of 17 tropical cyclones developed, with 12 strengthening to nameable storms, above the 1950-2000 average of 9.6 named storms per season.} Of the twelve tropical or subtropical storms, two of them strengthened into hurricanes, tying the record (with 1982 and 2013) for the lowest number in the satellite era. Neither hurricane became major hurricanes, which is Category 3 or greater on the Saffir–Simpson hurricane wind scale, and neither reached Category 2. Overall, the season was inactive, despite having a similar number of tropical waves as the previous season. The lack of activity was attributed to an El Niño – which causes below normal sea surface temperatures over the eastern Atlantic – and strong vertical wind shear. Collectively, the storms of the season caused at least 137 fatalities and more than $2.1 billion in damage. The last storm of the season, Subtropical Storm Delta, became extratropical on November 7, about 23 days before the official end of hurricane season on November 30.

Tropical cyclogenesis first occurred in the month of May, with the development of Subtropical Storm Alpha. The month of June featured two tropical cyclones, including Hurricane Agnes and a tropical depression. Two more systems formed in July, a subtropical storm and a tropical storm. August featured Hurricane Betty, Tropical Storm Carrie, and two tropical depressions. September featured slightly more cyclogenesis, with two unnamed tropical storms, Hurricane Dawn, Subtropical Storm Charlie, and a tropical depression. An additional two tropical depressions formed in October. Subtropical Storm Delta was the sole system in November, lasting from November 1 to November 7.

The season's activity was reflected with an Accumulated Cyclone Energy (ACE) rating of 36, the lowest value since 1962. Broadly speaking, ACE is a measure of the power of a tropical or subtropical storm multiplied by the length of time it existed. Therefore, a storm with a longer duration, such as Betty, will have high values of ACE. It is only calculated for full advisories on specific tropical and subtropical systems reaching or exceeding wind speeds of 39 mph (63 km/h). Accordingly, tropical depressions are not included here. After the storm has dissipated, typically after the end of the season, the NHC reexamines the data, and produces a final report on each storm. These revisions can lead to a revised ACE total either upward or downward compared to the operational value.

== Systems ==
=== Subtropical Storm Alpha ===
- Subtropical storm (SSHWS)
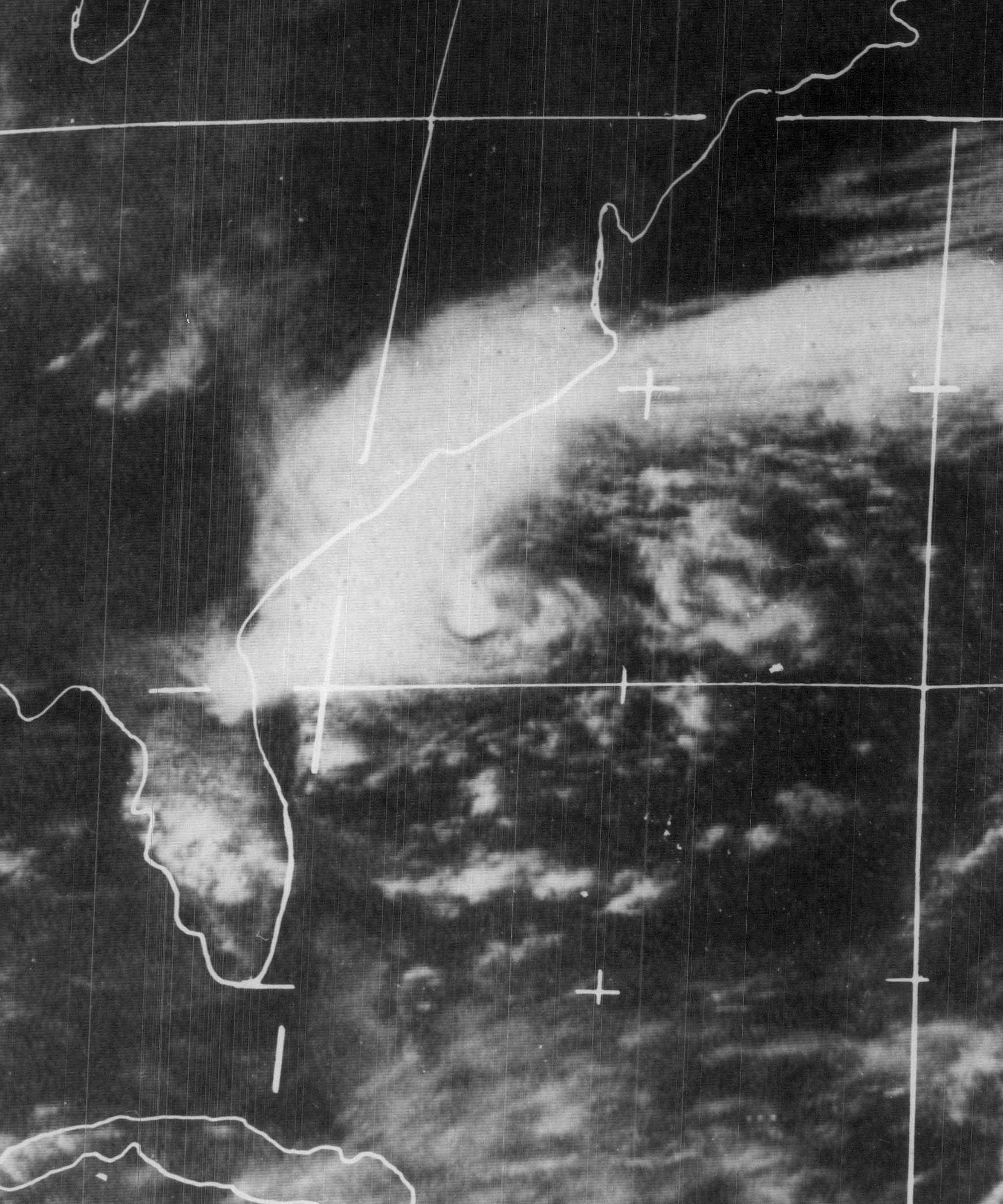
- Duration: May 23 – May 29
- Peak intensity: 70 mph (110 km/h) (1-min); 988 mbar (hPa)

The origins of Alpha were from a surface low northeast of Florida, associated with the larger-scale, cold core upper low. Late on May 23, it organized into a subtropical depression to the east of the Georgia/South Carolina border. A developing ridge blocked its northeast motion, turning the depression to the southeast. On May 25, a small, intense low-level center organized rapidly. By the next day, it attained gale-force winds and was moving southwestward. At 1600 UTC on May 26, the National Hurricane Center initiated advisories on Subtropical Cyclone Alpha, when the storm was about 225 mi (360 km) to the south of Cape Hatteras. Around that time, it reached its peak winds of 70 mph (110 km/h). Subtropical Storm Alpha was initially well-defined as it moved southwestward. The very small center was located along the eastern edge of the convection, while low-level cloud bands formed east of the center. The winds decreased steadily as it turned more westward on May 27. The National Hurricane Center initially thought the center might not have been at the surface, and the agency indicated low forecasting confidence, as they could not determine a circulation center. The difficulty arose from the large, sprawling nature of the storm, and by later on May 27 a new center formed, as confirmed by radar imagery and the Hurricane Hunters. That night, the extremely small center made landfall just south of Savannah, Georgia, affecting a very small area with winds of 65 mph (100 km/h) and a minimum pressure of 991 hPa (29.26 inHg). Around the time of landfall, Alpha developed a warm core, indicating some tropical characteristics. The storm weakened quickly over land, although it did not dissipate until two days later over the northeast Gulf of Mexico.

The interaction between Alpha and the high pressure system to its northeast caused cooler temperatures and gusty winds from Delaware southward. Wave heights reached up to 20 feet (6.1 m) along the Virginia capes. The storm dropped rainfall along the coast of North Carolina and Virginia, with a maximum of 6.97 inches (177 mm) reported in Ocracoke, North Carolina. While moving slowly off the North Carolina coast, Alpha caused heavy beach erosion, destroyed one house, and threatened the foundation of several other homes in the Outer Banks. Damage totaled over $50,000 (1972 USD). While the storm was traveling over the western Atlantic Ocean, the storm produced a large area of rough seas, which was considered the greatest threat from the storm. In northeastern Florida, police officers were stationed to ensure people did not swim in the dangerous seas. The high waves also halted work to deepen a harbor at the Mayport Naval Station. Two people drowned after the storm dissipated, when surf was still turbulent. Tides along the Georgia coast reached 2 to 3 feet (0.61 to 0.91 m) above normal, which caused some flooding and beach erosion. Wind gusts reached 58 mph (93 km/h) on Saint Simons Island. The winds knocked down trees and power lines, leaving some people without power in eastern Georgia. Damage was minor but widespread in the state, estimated at over $50,000 (1972 USD). Moderate rains spread in coastal areas from South Carolina through southern Florida.

=== Hurricane Agnes ===
- Category 1 hurricane (SSHWS)
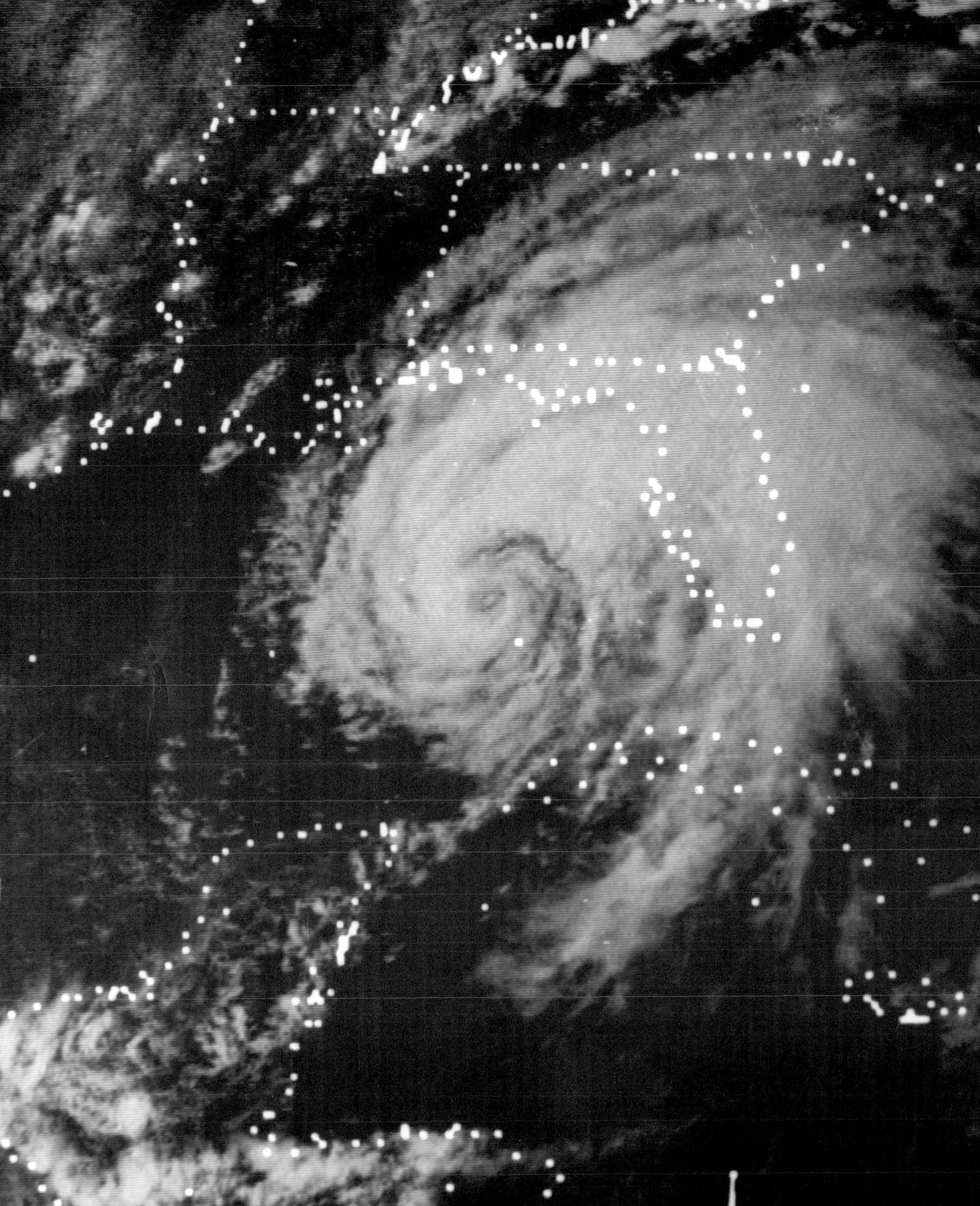
- Duration: June 14 – June 21
- Peak intensity: 80 mph (130 km/h) (1-min); 979 mbar (hPa)

A polar front and an upper trough over the Yucatán Peninsula spawned a tropical depression on June 14. The storm emerged into the western Caribbean Sea on June 15, and by the following day, it strengthened into Tropical Storm Agnes. The storm curved northward and brushed western Cuba on June 17. Agnes continued to intensify, and on June 18, it was upgraded to a hurricane. Minimal fluctuations in intensity occurred before the storm made landfall near Panama City, Florida, on June 19, with 75 mph (120 km/h) winds. After moving inland, Agnes rapidly weakened and was only a tropical depression when it entered Georgia. Thereafter, weakening slowed as the storm crossed over Georgia and into South Carolina. However, while over eastern North Carolina on June 21, Agnes re-strengthened into a tropical storm, as a result of baroclinic activity. It became post-tropical shortly thereafter, but continued to strengthen. Early the following day, the storm emerged into the Atlantic Ocean before re-curving northwestward and making landfall near New York City. Agnes quickly merged with a non-tropical low pressure system on June 23.

Heavy rainfall occurred in western Cuba, causing flooding that destroyed 97 houses, isolated a few cities, and flatted crops in low-lying areas. The storm left seven fatalities. Agnes caused a significant tornado outbreak, with at least 26 confirmed twisters, 24 of them in Florida and the other two in Georgia. The tornadoes alone resulted in over $4.5 million in damage and six fatalities. At least 2,082 structures in Florida suffered either major damage or were destroyed. About 1,355 other dwellings experienced minor losses. Though Agnes made landfall as a hurricane, no hurricane-force winds were reported. Abnormally high tides resulted in extensive damage, especially between Apalachicola and Cedar Key. The storm left nine deaths and approximately $40 million in damage in Florida. Generally minor effects were also recorded in the states of Alabama, Delaware, Georgia, Ohio, South Carolina, and Tennessee, as well as the New England region. However, one fatality was reported in Delaware and three were recorded in Georgia.

The most significant effects, by far, occurred in Pennsylvania, mostly due to severe flooding. Precipitation peaked at 18 in (460 mm) in Schuylkill County, causing several creeks and rivers crest at record height, including the Delaware, Juniata, Lackawanna, Susquehanna, and West Branch Susquehanna rivers. More than 100,000 people were forced to leave their homes due to flooding. In the state of Pennsylvania, more than 3,000 businesses and 68,000 homes were destroyed, leaving at least 220,000 people homeless. Agnes remains one of the worst natural disasters in Pennsylvania. New York also suffered severe damage. Similarly, rivers in the state crested high, including the Allegheny, Chemung, Genesee, Susquehanna, and Tioga rivers. Corning, Elmira, and Olean, as well as many other Southern Tier towns, were severely flooded. Throughout New York, 32,832 homes were damaged and 628 others were damaged. A total of 1,547 small businesses were extensively damaged or demolished. In Canada, a mobile home was toppled, killing two people. Overall, Agnes caused 131 fatalities and over $2.1 billion in damage.

=== Unnamed June tropical storm ===
- Tropical storm (SSHWS)
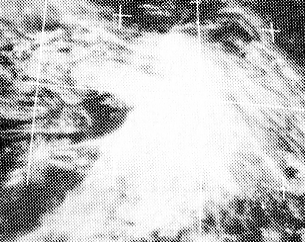
- Duration: June 18 – June 21
- Peak intensity: 50 mph (85 km/h) (1-min); 1007 mbar (hPa)

As Agnes was moving over the southeastern United States, a subtropical storm formed approximately 510 mi (820 km) southwest of Bermuda on June 18. It moved northeastward and headed toward the island. After becoming fully tropical, the system dissipated on June 21.

=== Unnamed July subtropical storm ===
- Subtropical storm (SSHWS)
- Duration: July 11 – July 13
- Peak intensity: 40 mph (65 km/h) (1-min); 1014 mbar (hPa)

A subtropical depression developed offshore North Florida on July 11. Moving generally northward, the system made landfall as a subtropical storm near Cape Fear in North Carolina on July 12. It dissipated over Maryland about two days later. Generally light rainfall was reported in several states, though 8 in (200 mm) of precipitation was recorded on Cedar Island, North Carolina.

=== Unnamed July tropical storm ===
- Tropical storm (SSHWS)
- Duration: July 18 – July 23
- Peak intensity: 45 mph (75 km/h) (1-min); 998 mbar (hPa)

A tropical depression originated about 570 mi (920 km) west-southwest of Flores Island in the Azores on July 18. It trekked slowly until July 19, at which time the system curved northeastward. The following day, the system became a tropical storm. It dissipated about 450 mi (720 km) northeast of Flores Island on July 23.

=== Hurricane Betty (Bravo) ===
- Category 1 hurricane (SSHWS)
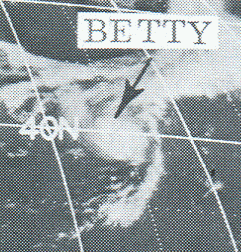
- Duration: August 22 – September 1
- Peak intensity: 90 mph (150 km/h) (1-min); 976 mbar (hPa)

An area of disturbed weather appeared on satellite imagery while forming within an old frontal zone on August 21. At 1200 UTC on the following day, a subtropical depression developed about 290 mi (470 km) north-northeast of Bermuda. The system strengthened slowly as it headed east-northeastward or eastward and by August 24, it became Subtropical Storm Bravo. During the next 24 hours, minimal intensification occurred. However, a deepening high-level trough and a building ridge enhanced outflow and deep convection on August 25. Additionally, reconnaissance aircraft flights began indicating a transition to a warm-core. Unfavorable northwesterly winds briefly halted further development, though by late on August 26, Bravo resumed acquiring tropical characteristics after another deepening trough accelerated the storm eastward.

After reconnaissance aircraft reported winds of 98 mph (158 km/h) and satellite imagery indicated a storm with a classic cyclonic appearance, Bravo was reclassified as Hurricane Betty while located about 920 mi (1,480 km) west of the Azores on August 27. After some further strengthening, Betty attained its peak intensity as a Category 2 hurricane with maximum sustained winds of 105 mph (169 km/h) and a minimum barometric pressure of 976 mbar (28.8 inHg) early on August 28. The hurricane then moved rapidly east-northeastward before decelerating late on the following day. Around that time, northerly winds aloft caused Betty to weaken to a Category 1 hurricane. After briefly moving southward, the storm curved back to a general westward direction and fell to tropical storm intensity on August 31. Later that day, Betty turned northward ahead of a trough and became extratropical about 565 mi (909 km) northwest of Corvo Island in the Azores on September 1.

=== Tropical Storm Carrie ===
- Tropical storm (SSHWS)
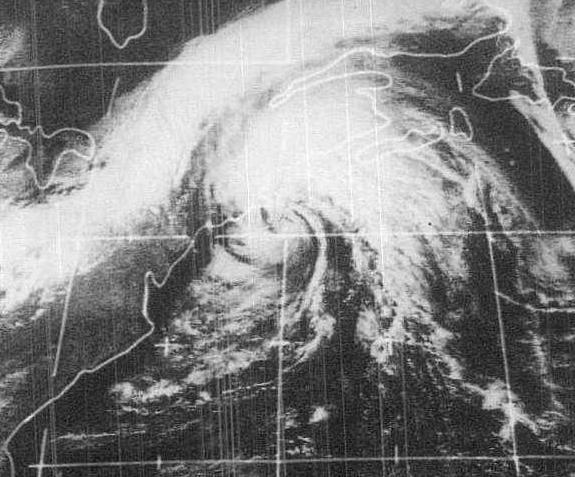
- Duration: August 29 – September 3
- Peak intensity: 65 mph (100 km/h) (1-min); 1002 mbar (hPa)

A complex system combining a tropical wave and an upper-level low led to the formation of a tropical depression east of Florida on August 29. It managed to become a tropical storm on August 31 and reached initial peak winds of 50 mph (80 km/h) later that day. However, upper-level winds increased, causing Carrie to weaken to a minimal tropical storm by September 2. Due to baroclinic processes, Carrie began to re-intensify, attaining peak winds of 65 mph (105 km/h) just prior to transitioning into an extratropical cyclone on September 3. The extratropical cyclone continued northeastward, and struck eastern Maine on September 4. By the following day, the extratropical cyclone dissipated over the Gulf of Saint Lawrence.

Carrie had a minimal impact on the East Coast south of New England, limited to increased swells, gusty winds, and light rainfall. The worst conditions occurred over southeastern New England, where wind gusts reached 84 mph (135 km/h) and rainfall exceeded 1 ft (0.30 m). Damage was most severe along and slightly inland from the coast. Thousands of people became stranded on offshore islands of Massachusetts after dangerous conditions created by the storm prompted the suspension of steamship service. Overall, damage was generally light, with total monetary losses valued at $1.78 million. Four deaths were blamed on the storm.

=== Unnamed early September subtropical storm ===
- Subtropical storm (SSHWS)
- Duration: September 3 – September 4
- Peak intensity: 50 mph (85 km/h) (1-min); 1002 mbar (hPa)

A subtropical storm developed about 840 mi (1,350 km) east-southeast of Bermuda on September 3. The system moved northeastward toward the Azores, but degenerated about 920 mi (1,480 km) southwest of Flores Island on September 5.

=== Tropical Storm Dawn ===
- Tropical storm (SSHWS)
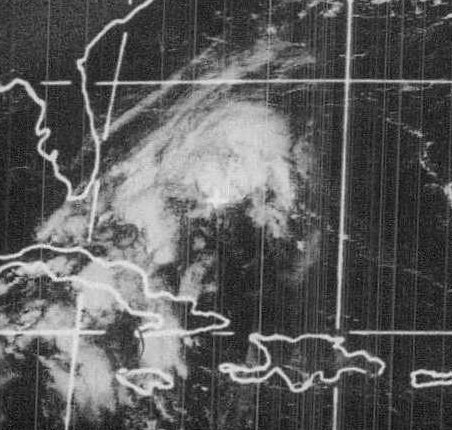
- Duration: September 5 – September 14
- Peak intensity: 65 mph (100 km/h) (1-min); 996 mbar (hPa)

A tropical wave, combined with an upper tropospheric trough, resulted in the development of a tropical depression near Cay Sal Bank, Bahamas, on September 5. Later that day, the depression struck Key Largo, Florida, before moving inland over the mainland of Florida. The storm brought very light rainfall to the state, peaking at 1.19 in (30 mm) in Tavernier. The system moved northeastward and soon re-emerged into the Atlantic. While located north of Grand Bahama on September 6, the depression intensified into Tropical Storm Dawn. On September 7, a cold low pressure developed near Cape Hatteras, North Carolina, which would influence much of Dawn's movement. Dawn then curved west-northwestward on September 8 and peaked with maximum sustained winds of 65 mph (105 km/h) and a minimum barometric pressure of 997 mbar (29.4 inHg).

With Dawn appearing as a threat to the Mid-Atlantic, storm and gale warnings were issued from Chincoteague Inlet, Virginia, to Cape May, New Jersey, on September 8. However, the storm veered southeastward on September 9. By late on September 10, after the cold low pressure area relinquished influence over Dawn, the cyclone began moving westward, but continued to deteriorate. Dawn weakened to a tropical depression while well east of Georgia late on September 12. The system approached the Sea Islands on September 13, but curved northeastward and remained offshore. Dawn dissipated less than 15 mi (24 km) east of Isle of Palms, South Carolina, on September 14. The storm also produced very light rainfall in Georgia and South Carolina.

=== Subtropical Storm Charlie ===
- Subtropical storm (SSHWS)
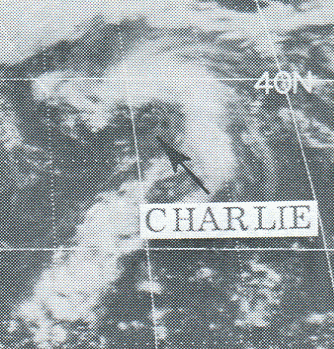
- Duration: September 19 – September 21
- Peak intensity: 65 mph (100 km/h) (1-min); ≤995 mbar (hPa)

A very small, circular subtropical depression developed about 460 mi (740 km) northeast of Bermuda on September 19. Initially, the storm moved north-northeastward and strengthened into Subtropical Storm Charlie early the following day. It then moved quickly northeastward and continued to strengthen. Later on September 20, Charlie peaked with maximum sustained winds of 65 mph (105 km/h). The system soon lost tropical characteristics and transitioned into an extratropical cyclone about 630 mi (1,010 km) east of Cape Race, Newfoundland, early on September 21. However, the extratropical storm deepened significantly, reaching a barometric pressure of 944 mbar (27.9 inHg), a reading typical of a strong Category 3 hurricane. Early on September 22, the extratropical cyclone dissipated over the far north Atlantic.

=== Unnamed late September subtropical storm ===
- Subtropical storm (SSHWS)
- Duration: September 29 – October 3
- Peak intensity: 40 mph (65 km/h) (1-min); ≤1010 mbar (hPa)

On October 1, a subtropical storm originated about 980 mi (1,580 km) northeast of Barbuda. The storm tracked generally northward and dissipated about 420 mi (680 km) south of the Avalon Peninsula in Newfoundland on October 3.

=== Subtropical Storm Delta ===
- Subtropical storm (SSHWS)
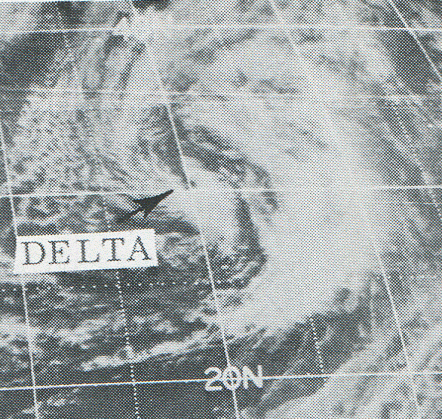
- Duration: November 1 – November 7
- Peak intensity: 45 mph (75 km/h) (1-min); 1001 mbar (hPa)

A southwestward-moving cold-core low pressure area developed into a subtropical depression while located about 950 mi (1,530 km) west-southwest of Flores Island in the Azores on November 1. After forming, the system soon strengthened and was upgraded to Subtropical Storm Delta. Early on November 3, Delta attained its peak intensity with maximum sustained winds of 45 mph (72 km/h) and a minimum barometric pressure of 1,001 mbar (29.6 inHg). Around that time, the subtropical storm briefly moved southward, before beginning a general eastward movement on November 4. Delta soon began to weaken and was reduced to a subtropical depression by the following day. It continued eastward until November 6, at which time the storm decelerated and curved northward. Delta dissipated while located about 790 mi (1,270 km) southwest of Flores Island.

=== Other systems ===
In addition to the named storms, there were several weak depressions during the season. On August 3, a tropical depression formed about 225 mi (360 km) northeast of Turks and Caicos Islands. After moving generally northwestward, the storm turned southwestward late on August 4, shortly before dissipating. Another tropical depression formed on August 17 while south of the Cabo Verde islands. Moving westward, the cyclone dissipated by August 18. The next tropical depression formed on September 20 while located about 570 mi (920 km) west-southwest of the Cabo Verde islands. The storm headed generally westward, but then began moving west-northwestward on September 21. Two days later, the depression dissipated halfway between the Cabo Verde islands and the Lesser Antilles.

Another tropical depression formed about 120 mi (190 km) west of Bolama, Guinea-Bissau, on October 5. The depression moved generally westward, before curving to the northwest on October 8. Four days later, the system dissipated approximately 800 mi (1,285 km) east of the Leeward Islands. Yet another tropical depression formed about 455 mi (730 km) southwest of Brava, Cape Verde, on October 17. Initially the depression moved generally west-northwestward and dissipated about halfway between Barbados and Cabo Verde islands.

Additionally, two systems previously classified as tropical depressions have since been removed the Atlantic hurricane database, known as AL071972 and AL081972. The former was previously believed to have tracked from Senegal to south of the Cabo Verde islands from September 5 and September 7. The Atlantic hurricane reanalysis project noted in 2026 that AL081972 may have existed as a tropical depression on September 12 and September 13, but was more likely a weak low-pressure area.

== Storm names ==
The following list of names was used for named tropical storms that formed in the north Atlantic in 1972. Storms were named Agnes, Betty and Dawn for the first (and only, in the case of Agnes) time in 1972.

- Agnes
- Betty
- Carrie
- Dawn
- Edna (unused)
- Felice (unused)
- Gerda (unused)
- Harriet (unused)
- Ilene (unused)
- Jane (unused)
- Kara (unused)
- Lucile (unused)
- Mae (unused)
- Nadine (unused)
- Odette (unused)
- Polly (unused)
- Rita (unused)
- Sarah (unused)
- Tina (unused)
- Velma (unused)
- Wendy (unused)

The NATO phonetic alphabet (below) was used to designates subtropical cyclones that formed in the north Atlantic in 1972. Subtropical Storm Bravo became Betty after acquiring tropical characteristics.

- Alpha
- Bravo
- Charlie
- Delta
- Echo (unused)
- Foxtrot (unused)
- Golf (unused)
- Hotel (unused)
- India (unused)
- Juliett (unused)
- Kilo (unused)
- Lima (unused)
- Mike (unused)
- November (unused)
- Oscar (unused)
- Papa (unused)
- Quebec (unused)
- Romeo (unused)
- Sierra (unused)
- Tango (unused)
- Uniform (unused)
- Victor (unused)
- Whiskey (unused)
- Xray (unused)
- Yankee (unused)
- Zulu (unused)

=== Retirement ===
After the end of the 1972 Atlantic hurricane season, the name Agnes was retired due to the amount of damage and loss of life.

== Season effects ==
This is a table of all of the storms that formed in the 1972 Atlantic hurricane season. It includes their name, duration, peak classification and intensities, areas affected, damage, and death totals. Deaths in parentheses are additional and indirect (an example of an indirect death would be a traffic accident), but were still related to that storm. Damage and deaths include totals while the storm was extratropical, a wave, or a low, and all of the damage figures are in 1972 USD.

Saffir–Simpson scale
TD	TS	C1	C2	C3	C4	C5

1972 North Atlantic tropical cyclone season statistics
Storm name	Dates active	Storm category at peak intensity	Max 1-min wind mph (km/h)	Min. press. (mbar)	Areas affected	Damage (US$)	Deaths	Ref(s).
Alpha	May 23–29	Subtropical storm	70 (110)	988	Southeastern United States	$100,000	2	
Agnes	June 14–21	Category 1 hurricane	80 (130)	979	Yucatán Peninsula, western Cuba, Eastern United States, Southern Ontario, Quebec	$2.1 billion	131	
Three	June 18–21	Tropical storm	50 (85)	1007	North Carolina	None	None	
Four	July 11–13	Subtropical storm	40 (65)	1014	None	None	None	
Five	July 18–23	Tropical storm	45 (75)	1000	None	None	None	
Six	August 3–4	Tropical depression	35 (55)	1008	None	None	None	
Nine	August 17–18	Tropical depression	30 (45)	Unknown	Cabo Verde	None	None	
Betty (Bravo)	August 22 – September 1	Category 1 hurricane	90 (150)	976	None	None	None	
Carrie	August 29 – September 3	Tropical storm	50 (85)	1002	Northeastern United States	$1.78 million	4	
Twelve	September 3–5	Subtropical storm	50 (85)	1000	None	None	None	
Dawn	September 5–14	Tropical storm	65 (100)	997	Southeastern United States, Mid-Atlantic United States	Minimal	None	
Charlie	September 19–21	Subtropical storm	65 (100)	≤996	None	None	None	
Fifteen	September 20–23	Tropical depression	35 (55)	1009	None	None	None	
Sixteen	September 29 – October 3	Subtropical storm	40 (65)	1012	None	None	None	
Seventeen	October 5–12	Tropical depression	35 (55)	1006	None	None	None	
Eighteen	October 17–22	Tropical depression	35 (55)	Unknown	None	None	None	
Delta	November 1–7	Subtropical storm	45 (75)	1001	None	None	None	
Season aggregates
17 systems	May 23 – November 7		90 (150)	976		$2.1 billion	137	

== See also ==
- 1972 Pacific hurricane season
- 1972 Pacific typhoon season
- 1972 North Indian Ocean cyclone season
- Australian region cyclone seasons: 1971–72 1972–73
- South Pacific cyclone seasons: 1971–72 1972–73
- South-West Indian Ocean cyclone seasons: 1971–72 1972–73
