= Timeline of the 1972 Atlantic hurricane season =

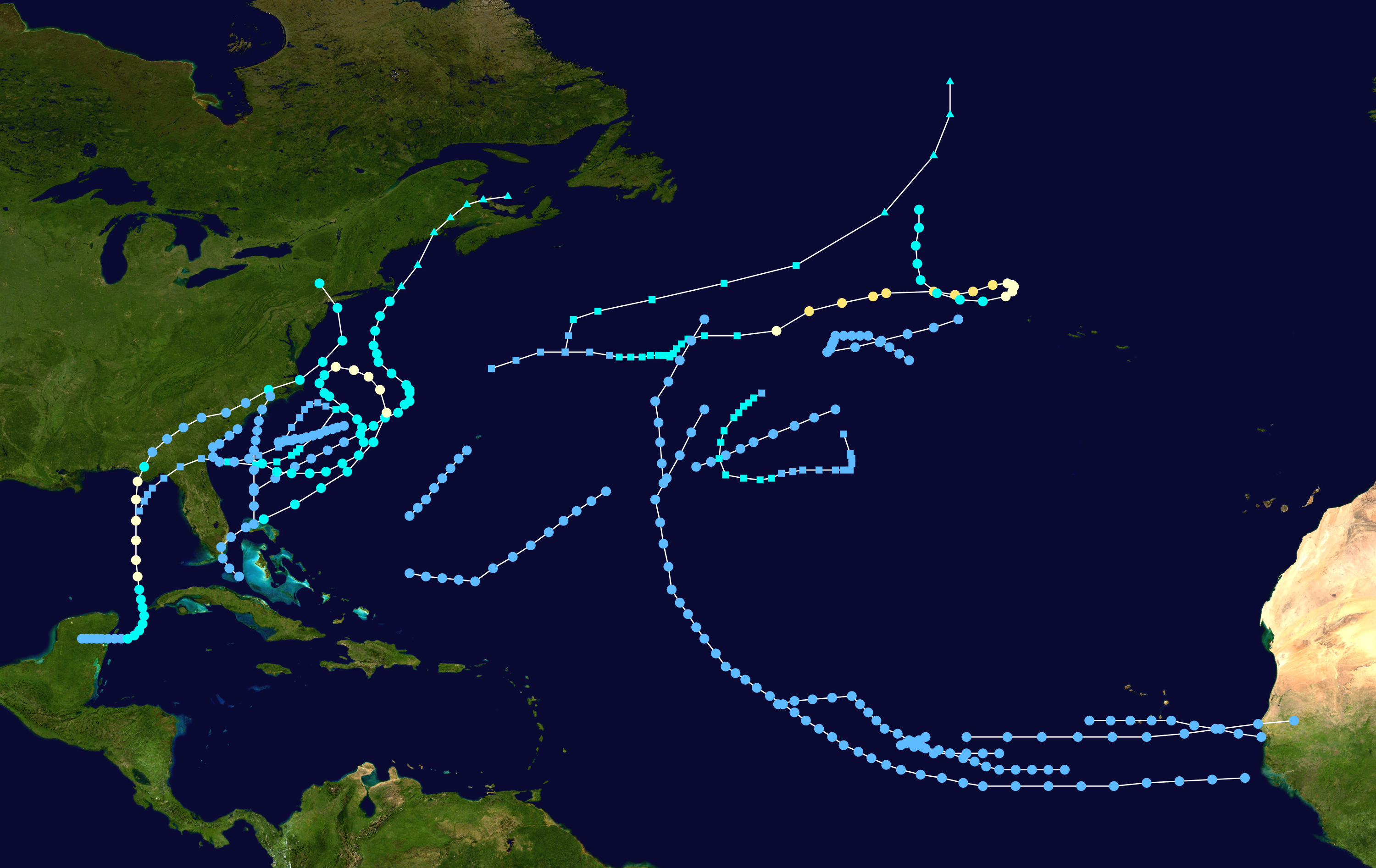
- Season summary map

Season boundaries
- First system formed: May 23, 1972
- Last system dissipated: November 7, 1972

Strongest system
- Name: Betty (Bravo)
- Maximum winds: 105 mph (165 km/h) (1-minute sustained)
- Lowest pressure: 976 mbar (hPa; 28.82 inHg)

Longest lasting system
- Name: Betty (Bravo)
- Duration: 10 days
Storm articles
- Subtropical Storm Alpha (1972)
- Hurricane Agnes
- Tropical Storm Carrie (1972)

The 1972 Atlantic hurricane season was a cycle of the annual tropical cyclone season in the Atlantic Ocean in the Northern Hemisphere. It was a significantly below average season, (Note: An average Atlantic hurricane season, as defined by the National Oceanic and Atmospheric Administration, has 12 tropical storms, six hurricanes and two major hurricanes.) having only four fully tropical named storms. The season officially began on June 1, 1972 and ended on November 30, 1972. These dates, adopted by convention, historically describe the period in each year when most tropical systems form. However, storm formation is possible at any time of the year, as demonstrated in 1972 by the formation of Subtropical Storm Alpha on May 23. The season's final storm, Subtropical Storm Delta, dissipated on November 7. The season produced nineteen tropical or subtropical cyclones, of which seven intensified into tropical or subtropical storms; three became hurricanes, of which Betty, with sustained winds of 105 mph (165 km/h) and an atmospheric pressure of 976 mbar (28.82 inHg), was the strongest.

This timeline documents tropical cyclone formations, strengthening, weakening, landfalls, extratropical transitions, and dissipations during the season. It includes information that was not released throughout the season, meaning that data from post-storm reviews by the National Hurricane Center, such as a storm that was not initially warned upon, has been included.

The time stamp for each event is first stated using Coordinated Universal Time (UTC), the 24-hour clock where 00:00 = midnight UTC. The NHC uses both UTC and the time zone where the center of the tropical cyclone is currently located. The time zones utilized (east to west) prior to 2020 were: Atlantic, Eastern, and Central. In this timeline, the respective area time is included in parentheses. Additionally, figures for maximum sustained winds and position estimates are rounded to the nearest 5 units (miles, or kilometers), following National Hurricane Center practice. Direct wind observations are rounded to the nearest whole number. Atmospheric pressures are listed to the nearest millibar and nearest hundredth of an inch of mercury.

== Timeline ==
=== May ===
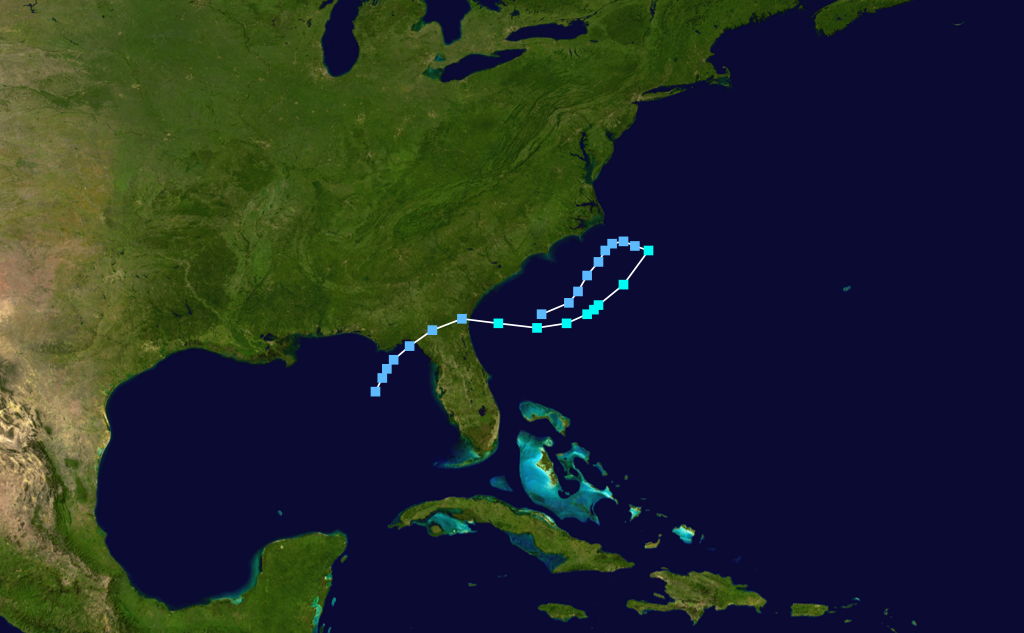
Track Map of Subtropical Storm Alpha

May 23

- 18:00 UTC (2:00 p.m. EDT) – A subtropical depression forms while located about 285 km (175 mi) to the southeast of Savannah, Georgia.

May 26

- 00:00 UTC (8:00 p.m. EDT May 25) – The subtropical depression previously located to the southeast of Savannah, Georgia, is classified as a subtropical storm after it develops gale-force winds.

May 26

- 12:00 UTC (8:00 a.m. EDT) – The subtropical storm attains its peak intensity, with maximum sustained wind speeds of 70 mph (115 km/h).
- 16:00 UTC (12:00 p.m. EDT) – The National Hurricane Center (NHC) initiates advisories on the system, which is named Subtropical Storm Alpha.

May 28

- 00:00 UTC (8:00 p.m. EDT, May 27) – Subtropical Storm Alpha weakens into a subtropical depression, after it makes landfall near Brunswick, Georgia.
- 02:00 UTC (10:00 p.m. EDT, May 27) – The final advisory on Subtropical Depression Alpha as it moves into Florida.
- 12:00 UTC (8:00 a.m. EDT) – Subtropical Depression Alpha emerges into the Gulf of Mexico, with winds of 35 mph (55 km/h).

May 29

- 12:00 UTC (8:00 a.m. EDT) – Subtropical Depression Alpha is last noted in the Gulf of Mexico, before it dissipates later that day.

=== June ===
June 1

- The 1972 Atlantic hurricane season officially begins.

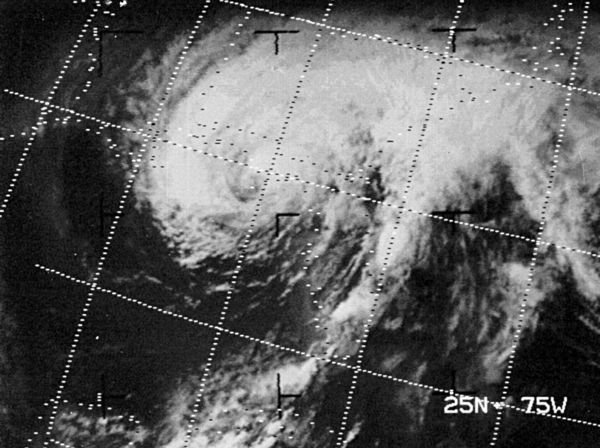
Hurricane Agnes at peak strength on June 19, 1972

June 14

- 12:00 UTC (7:00 a.m. CDT) – A tropical depression forms over the Yucatan Peninsula.

June 15

- 18:00 UTC (1:00 p.m. CDT) – The tropical depression emerges off the Yucatan Peninsula into the western Caribbean Sea with winds of 35 mph (55 km/h).

June 16

- 12:00 UTC (7:00 a.m. CDT) – The tropical depression strengthens into Tropical Storm Agnes.

June 18

- 12:00 UTC (7:00 a.m. CDT) – Tropical Storm Agnes strengthens into the first hurricane of the season.

June 19

- 06:00 UTC (1:00 a.m. CDT) – Hurricane Agnes attains its peak intensity, with maximum sustained winds of 85 mph (135 km/h).

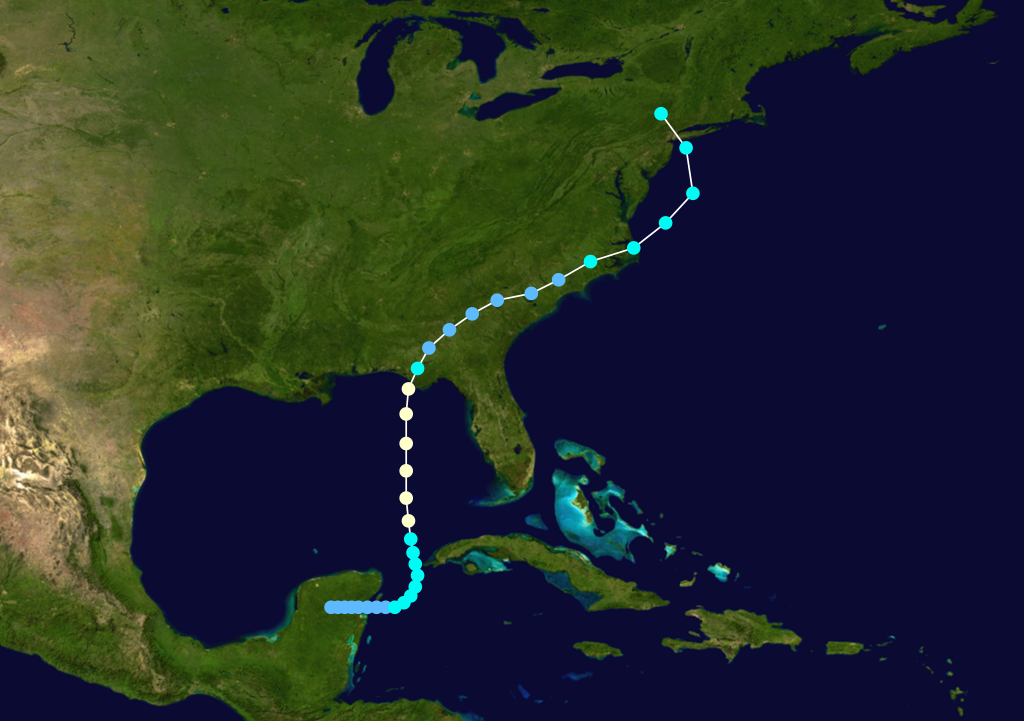
Track map of Hurricane Agnes

- 18:00 UTC (1:00 p.m. CDT) – Hurricane Agnes makes landfall near Panama City, Florida with winds of 85 mph (135 km/h).

June 20

- 00:00 UTC (7:00 p.m CDT, June 19) – Hurricane Agnes weakens into a tropical storm.
- 06:00 UTC (1:00 a.m. CDT) – Tropical Storm Agnes rapidly weakens into a tropical depression.

June 21

- 18:00 UTC (2:00 p.m. EDT) – Tropical Depression Agnes unexpectedly re-strengthens into a tropical storm while over eastern North Carolina.

June 22

- 00:00 UTC (8:00 p.m. EDT, June 21) – Tropical Storm Agnes emerges into the Atlantic Ocean near Nags Head, North Carolina.
- 12:00 UTC (8:00 a.m. EDT) – Tropical Storm Agnes reaches its secondary peak intensity, with maximum winds of 70 mph (115 km/h).
- 18:00 UTC (1:00 p.m. EDT) – Tropical Storm Agnes makes landfall near New York City, New York with winds of 65 mph (105 km/h).

June 23

- 04:00 UTC, (12:00 a.m. EDT) – The NHC issues its final advisory on Tropical Storm Agnes, after the system is absorbed by a developing extratropical cyclone over north-eastern Pennsylvania.

=== July ===
- No tropical cyclones form in the Atlantic Ocean during the month of July.

=== August ===
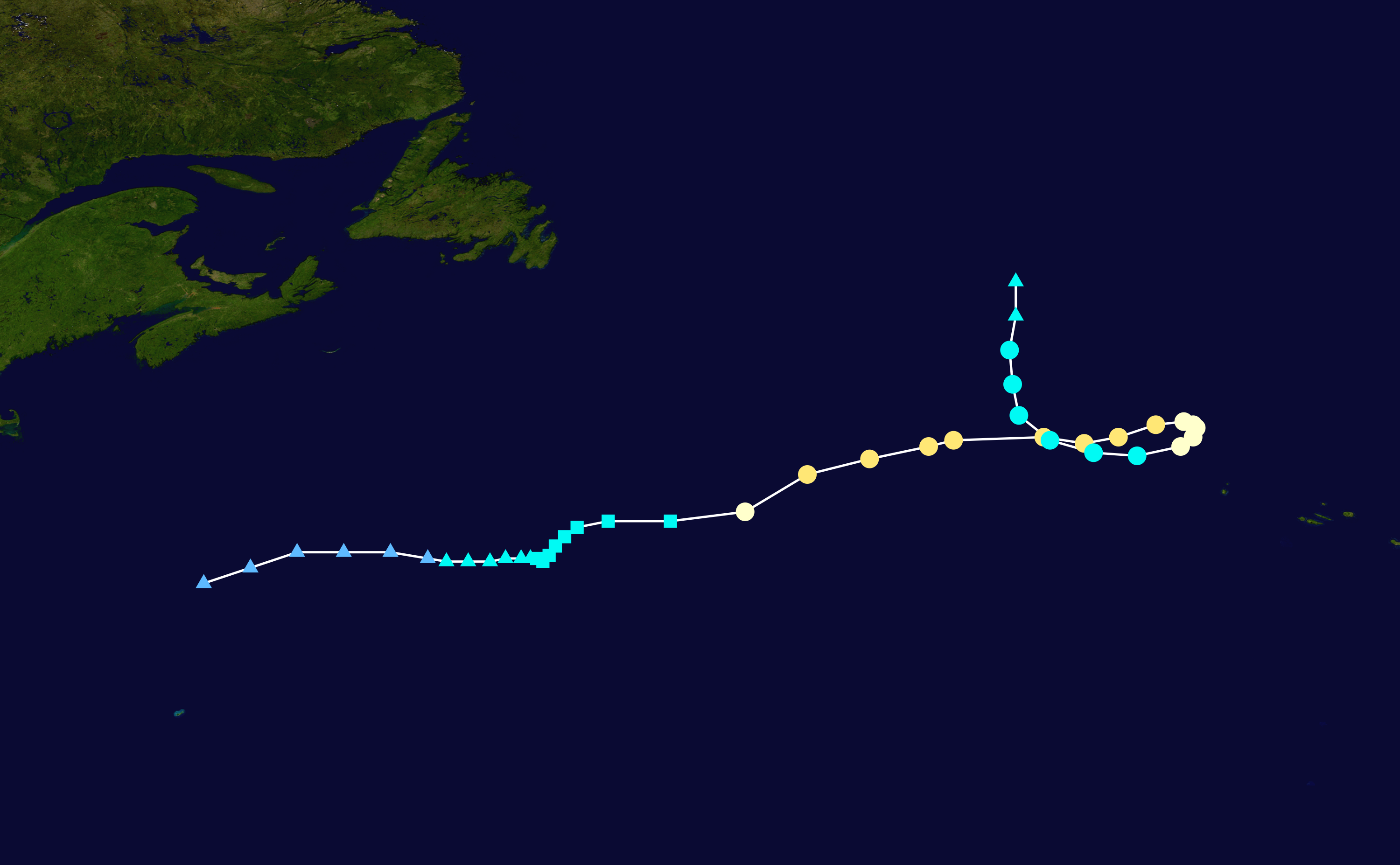
Track Map of Hurricane Betty

August 22

- 12:00 UTC (9:00 a.m. ADT) – A subtropical depression forms to the north of Bermuda.

August 24

- 00:00 UTC (9:00 p.m. ADT, August 23) – The subtropical depression strengthens into a subtropical storm, and earns the name Bravo.

August 25

- 06:00 UTC (3:00 a.m. ADT) – Subtropical Storm Bravo becomes tropical and is renamed Betty.

August 27

- 12:00 UTC (9:00 a.m. ADT) – Tropical Storm Betty strengthens into the second hurricane of the season.
- 18:00 UTC (3:00 p.m. ADT) – Hurricane Betty strengthens into a category 2 hurricane.

August 28

- 00:00 UTC (9:00 p.m. ADT, August 27) – Hurricane Betty reaches its peak intensity, with maximum winds of 105 mph (170 km/h).

August 29

- 12:00 UTC (8:00 a.m. EDT) – A tropical depression forms to the west of Daytona Beach, Florida.
- 18:00 UTC (3:00 p.m. ADT) – Hurricane Betty weakens into a category 1 hurricane.

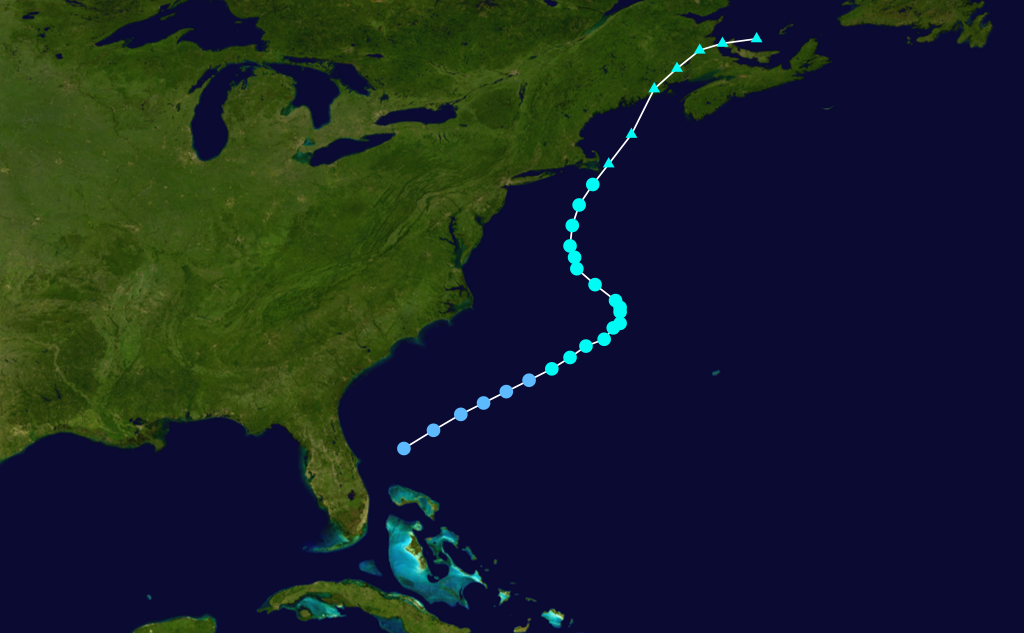
Track Map of Tropical Storm Carrie

August 31

- 00:00 UTC (8:00 p.m. EDT, August 30) – The tropical depression strengthens into a tropical storm, and is named Carrie.

August 31

- 00:00 UTC (9:00 p.m. ADT, August 30) – Hurricane Betty weakens into a tropical storm.
- 18:00 UTC (2:00 p.m. EDT) – Tropical Storm Carrie reaches its initial peak intensity, with maximum sustained winds of 60 mph (95 km/h).

=== September ===
September 1

- 18:00 UTC (3:00 p.m. ADT) – Tropical Storm Betty becomes extratropical in the frigid waters of the North Atlantic.

September 3

- 18:00 UTC (2:00 p.m. EDT) – Tropical Storm Carrie attains its peak intensity, with maximum sustained wind speeds of 70 mph (115 km/h).

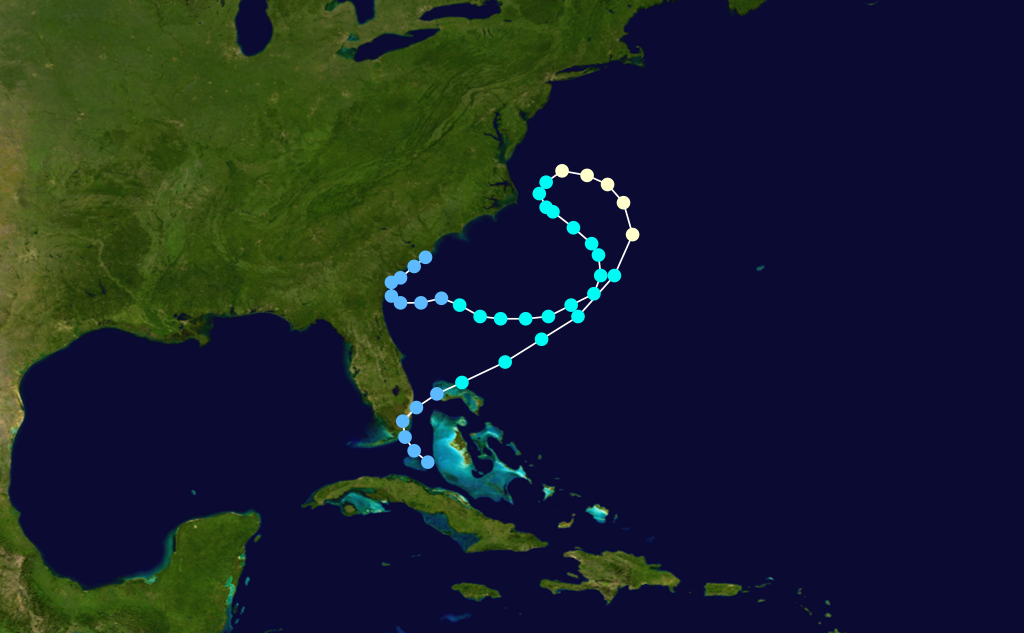
Track Map of Hurricane Dawn

September 4

- 00:00 UTC (9:00 p.m. ADT, September 3) – Tropical Storm Carrie becomes extratropical.

September 5

- 00:00 UTC (8:00 p.m. EDT, September 4) – A tropical depression forms northeast of Santa Clara, Cuba.
- 18:00 UTC (2:00 p.m. EDT) – The tropical depression makes landfall on Key Largo, Florida with winds of 35 mph (55 km/h).

September 6

- 00:00 UTC (8:00 p.m. EDT, September 5) – The tropical depression emerges off the Floridian coast into the North Atlantic.
- 12:00 UTC (8:00 a.m. EDT) – The tropical depression strengthens into a tropical storm, being named Dawn.

September 7

- 18:00 UTC (2:00 p.m. EDT) – Tropical Storm Dawn strengthens into the third and final hurricane of the season.

September 8

- 00:00 UTC (8:00 p.m. EDT, September 7) – Hurricane Dawn attains its peak intensity, with maximum sustained winds of 80 mph (130 km/h).

September 9

- 00:00 UTC (8:00 p.m. EDT, September 8) – Hurricane Dawn weakens into a tropical storm.

September 12

- 18:00 UTC (2:00 p.m. EDT) – Tropical Storm Dawn weakens into a tropical depression.

September 14

- 12:00 UTC (8:00 a.m. EDT) – Tropical Depression Dawn dissipates northeast of Charleston, South Carolina after having paralleled the Georgia and South Carolina coasts for the previous 24 hours.

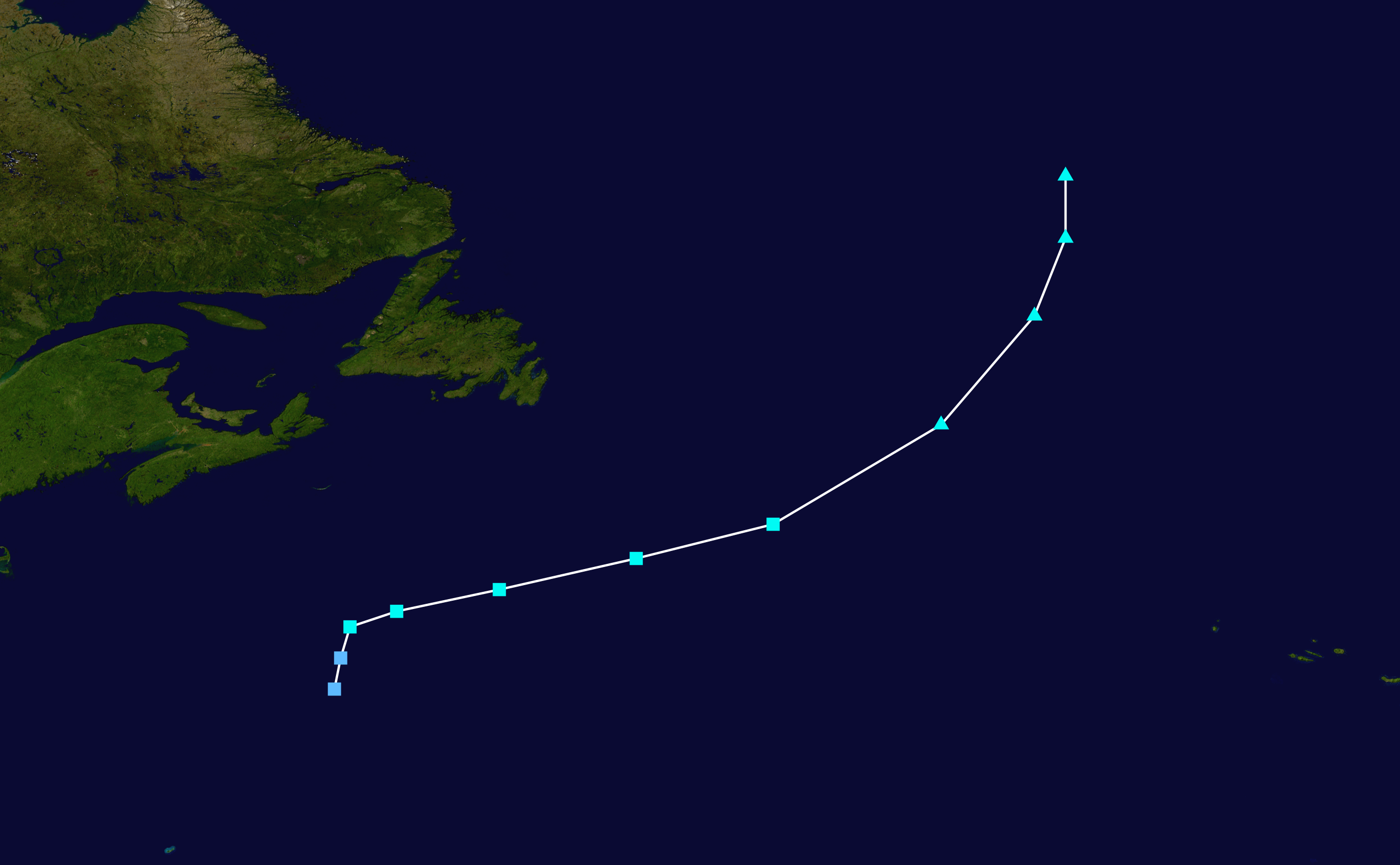
Track Map of Subtropical Storm Charlie

September 19

- 12:00 UTC (9:00 a.m. ADT) – A subtropical depression forms northeast of Bermuda.

September 20

- 00:00 UTC (9:00 p.m. ADT, September 19) – The subtropical depression strengthens into Subtropical Storm Charlie.

September 21

- 00:00 UTC (9:00 p.m. ADT, September 20) – Subtropical Storm Charlie reaches its peak intensity, with maximum sustained winds of 65 mph (105 km/h).

September 21

- 06:00 UTC (3:00 a.m. ADT) – Subtropical Storm Charlie becomes extratropical.

=== October ===
- No tropical cyclones form in the Atlantic Ocean during the month of October.

=== November ===
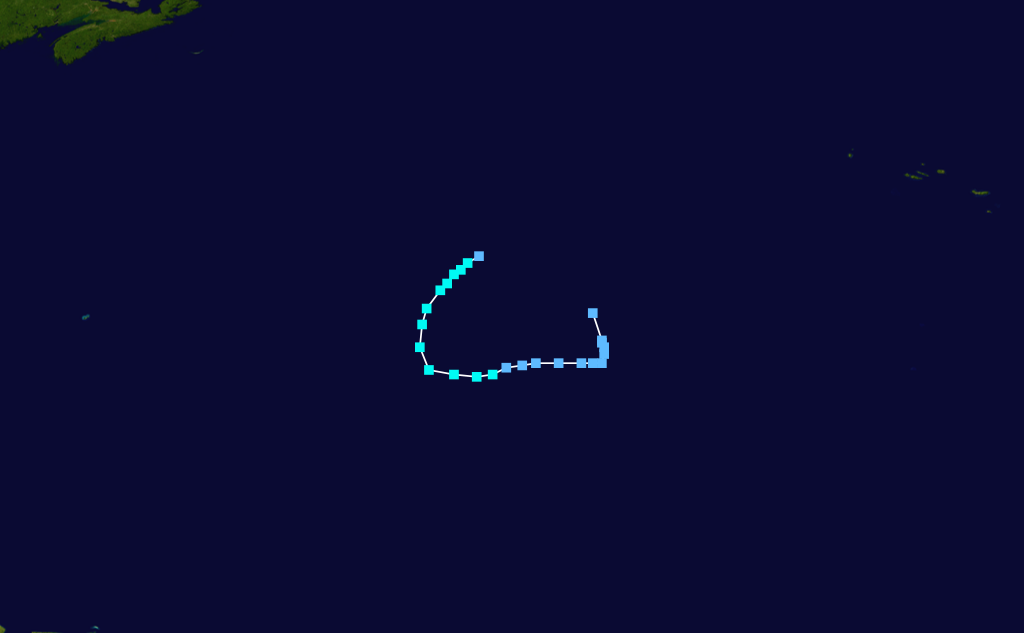
Track Map of Subtropical Storm Delta

November 1

- 3:00 p.m. ADT (18:00 UTC (3:00 p.m. ADT) – A subtropical depression forms in the central North Atlantic.

November 2

- 00:00 UTC (9:00 p.m. ADT, November 1) – The subtropical depression strengthens into Subtropical Storm Delta.
- 12:00 UTC (9:00 a.m. ADT) – Subtropical Storm Delta reaches its peak strength, with maximum sustained winds of 45 mph (70 km/h).

November 5

- 00:00 UTC (9:00 p.m. ADT, November 4) – Subtropical Storm Delta weakens into a subtropical depression.

November 7

- 18:00 UTC (3:00 p.m. ADT) – Subtropical Depression Delta is last noted, before it dissipates well to the south-west of the Azores later that day.

November 30

- The 1972 Atlantic hurricane season officially ends.

== See also ==
- Lists of Atlantic hurricanes
