= Hurricane Agnes =

Category 1 Atlantic hurricane in 1972

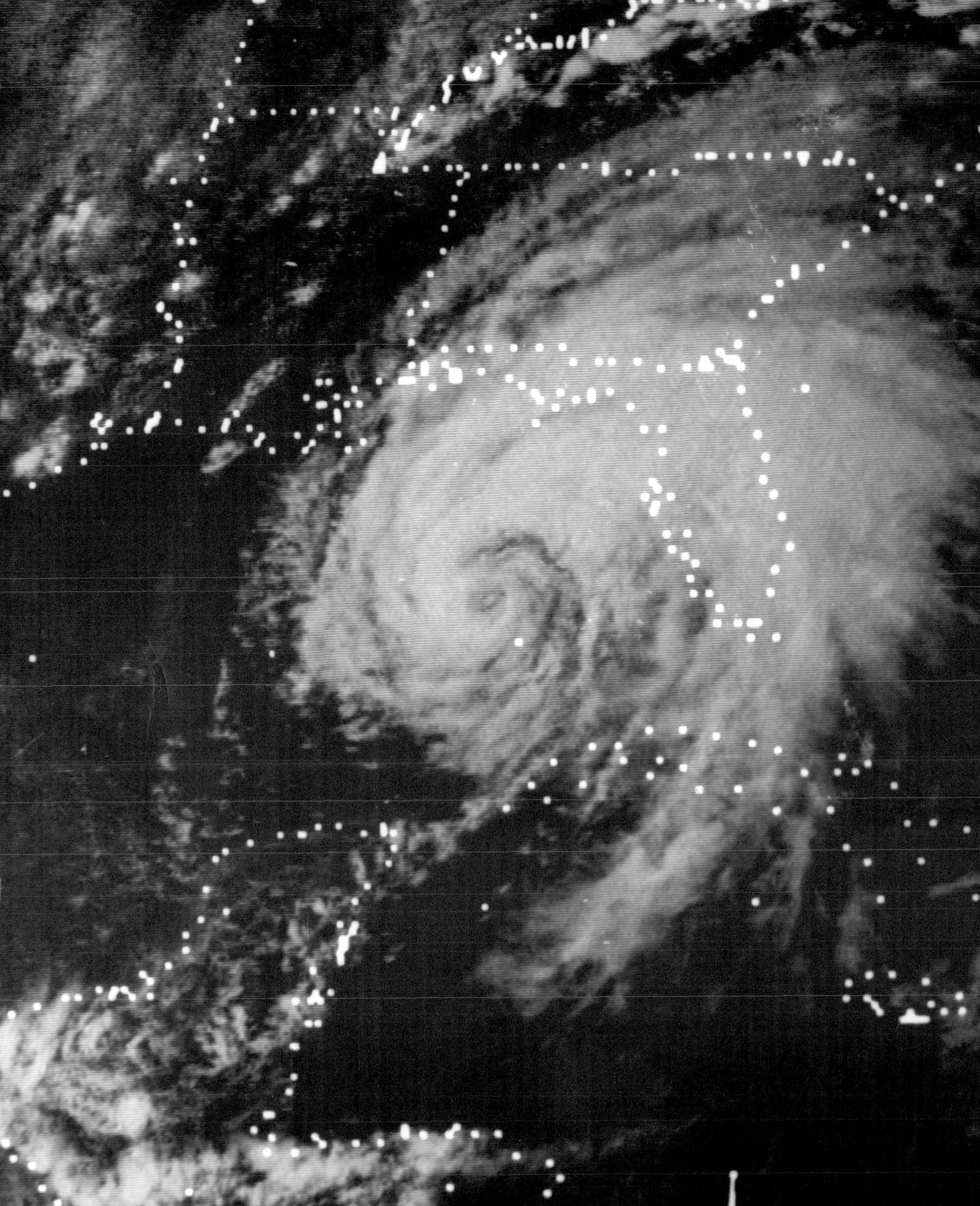
- Agnes near peak intensity in the Gulf of Mexico on June 18

Meteorological history
- Formed: June 14, 1972
- Extratropical: June 21, 1972
- Dissipated: June 25, 1972

Category 1 hurricane
- 1-minute sustained (SSHWS/NWS)
- Highest winds: 80 mph (130 km/h)
- Lowest pressure: 979 mbar (hPa); 28.91 inHg

Overall effects
- Fatalities: 128 direct
- Damage: $2.1 billion (1972 USD)
- Areas affected: Yucatán Peninsula, Western Cuba, East Coast of the United States (especially Pennsylvania), Atlantic Canada, Iceland, British Isles
- IBTrACS
- Part of the 1972 Atlantic hurricane season

Hurricane Agnes was the second tropical cyclone and first named storm of the 1972 Atlantic hurricane season. It developed as a tropical depression on June 14 from the interaction of a polar front and an upper trough over the Yucatán Peninsula. The storm emerged into the western Caribbean Sea on June 15, and strengthened into Tropical Storm Agnes the next day. Thereafter, Agnes slowly curved northward and passed just west of Cuba on June 17. Early on June 18, the storm intensified enough to be upgraded to Hurricane Agnes. Heading northward, the hurricane eventually made landfall near Panama City, Florida, late on June 19. After moving inland, Agnes rapidly weakened and was only a tropical depression when it entered Georgia. The weakening trend halted as the storm crossed over Georgia and into South Carolina. While over eastern North Carolina, Agnes re-strengthened into a tropical storm on June 21, as a result of baroclinic activity, before becoming post-tropical shortly thereafter. Early the following day, the now-extratropical storm emerged into the Atlantic Ocean before re-curving northwestward and making landfall near New York City. Agnes dissipated soon after, but the moisture remained over the Mid-Atlantic and Northeast.

Though it moved slowly across the Yucatán Peninsula, the damage Agnes caused in Mexico is unknown. Although the storm bypassed the tip of Cuba, heavy rainfall occurred, killing seven people. In Florida, Agnes caused a significant tornado outbreak, with at least 26 confirmed twisters, two of which were spawned in Georgia. The tornadoes and two initially unconfirmed tornadoes in Florida alone resulted in over $4.5 million (1972 USD) in damage and six fatalities. At least 2,082 structures in Florida suffered either major damage or were destroyed. About 1,355 other dwellings experienced minor losses. Though Agnes made landfall as a hurricane, no hurricane-force winds were reported. Along the coast abnormally high tides resulted in extensive damage, especially between Apalachicola and Cedar Key. Light to moderate rainfall was reported in Florida, though no significant flooding occurred. In Georgia, damage was limited to two tornadoes, which caused approximately $275,000 in losses. Minimal effects were also recorded in Alabama, Connecticut, Delaware, Rhode Island, South Carolina, and Tennessee; though one fatality was reported in Delaware. The most significant effects, by far, occurred in Pennsylvania, mostly due to intense flooding. The tropical storm severely flooded the Susquehanna River and the Lackawanna River, causing major damage to the Wilkes-Barre/Scranton metropolitan area. In both Pennsylvania and New Jersey combined, about 43,594 structures were either destroyed or significantly damaged. In Canada, a mobile home was toppled, killing two people.

Agnes was the costliest hurricane to hit the United States at the time, causing an estimated $2.1 billion in damage. The hurricane's death toll was 128. The effects of Agnes were widespread, from the Caribbean to Canada, with much of the east coast of the United States affected. Damage was heaviest in Pennsylvania, where Agnes was the state's wettest tropical cyclone. Due to the significant effects, the name Agnes was retired in the spring of 1973.

== Meteorological history ==
Map plotting the storm's track and intensity, according to the Saffir–Simpson scale Map key Saffir–Simpson scale Tropical depression (≤38 mph, ≤62 km/h) Tropical storm (39–73 mph, 63–118 km/h) Category 1 (74–95 mph, 119–153 km/h) Category 2 (96–110 mph, 154–177 km/h) Category 3 (111–129 mph, 178–208 km/h) Category 4 (130–156 mph, 209–251 km/h) Category 5 (≥157 mph, ≥252 km/h) Unknown Storm type Tropical cyclone Subtropical cyclone Extratropical cyclone, remnant low, tropical disturbance, or monsoon depression

In early-mid June 1972, atmospheric conditions favored tropical cyclogenesis in the Caribbean Sea. Banded convection developed in the northwestern Caribbean Sea by June 11, though the system did not significantly organize. After an upper trough moved east, wind shear decreased, causing lower atmospheric pressures observations in Cozumel, Quintana Roo, Mexico. It is estimated that a tropical depression developed by 1200 UTC on June 14, while centered over the Yucatán Peninsula, about 78 miles (126 km) southeast of Mérida, Yucatán. The depression tracked eastward and entered the western Caribbean Sea on June 15. Operationally, the National Hurricane Center did not initiate advisories on the depression until 1500 UTC on June 15. Early on June 16 at 0000 UTC, the depression strengthened into Tropical Storm Agnes. However, the depression was not operationally upgraded until sixteen hours later. After becoming a tropical storm on June 16, Agnes slowly curved northward and approached the Yucatán Channel. Late on June 17, it was noted that projected path indicated the possibly of landfall in western Cuba. However, the storm remained offshore, though it closely brushed the western tip of Cuba. At 1200 UTC on June 18, Agnes intensified into a hurricane while in the southeastern Gulf of Mexico.

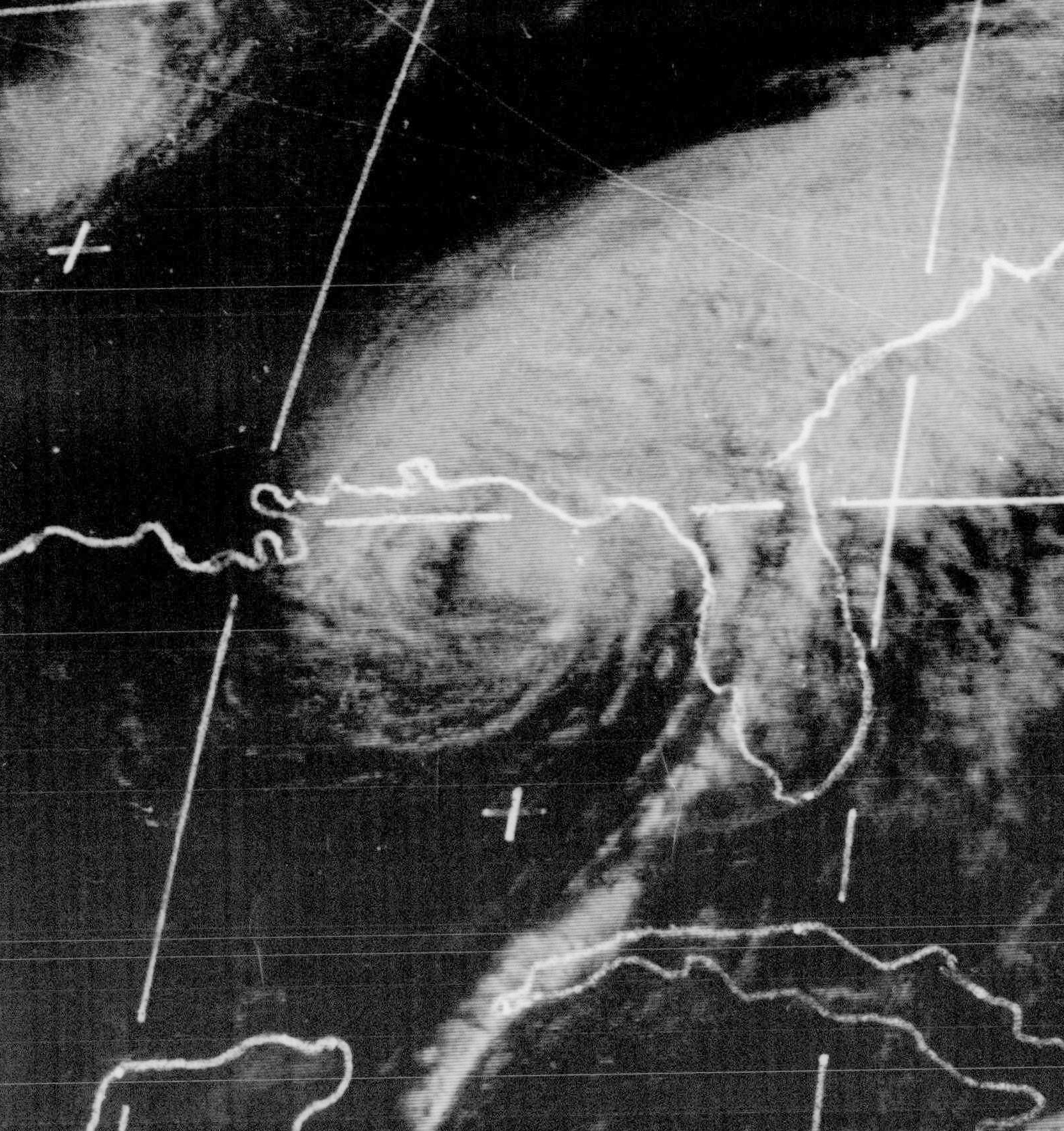
Hurricane Agnes approaching landfall in the Florida Panhandle on June 19

Prematurely, the National Hurricane Center operationally upgraded Agnes to a hurricane at 0200 UTC on that day. Upon becoming a hurricane, Agnes attained its maximum sustained winds of 85 mph (140 km/h), though it had not reached its minimum atmospheric pressure. Due to unfavorable conditions, Agnes leveled-off slightly in intensity and weakened to a minimal hurricane while approaching the Gulf Coast of the United States. Shortly before 2200 UTC on June 19, Agnes made landfall near Cape San Blas, Florida with winds of 75 mph (120 km/h). At 0000 UTC on June 20, only a few hours after moving inland, Agnes weakened to a tropical storm. After crossing the Florida/Alabama/Georgia stateline, Agnes rapidly weakened to a tropical depression. While over Georgia, the depression curved northeastward and eventually to the east-northeast after entering South Carolina. Though the storm had not dissipated, the National Hurricane Center issued its final bulletin on Agnes at 1600 UTC on June 20. By early on June 21, a large extratropical trough spawned a low pressure area, which resulted in baroclinic activity. As a result, Agnes restrengthened into a tropical storm at 1800 UTC on June 21, while centered over eastern North Carolina.

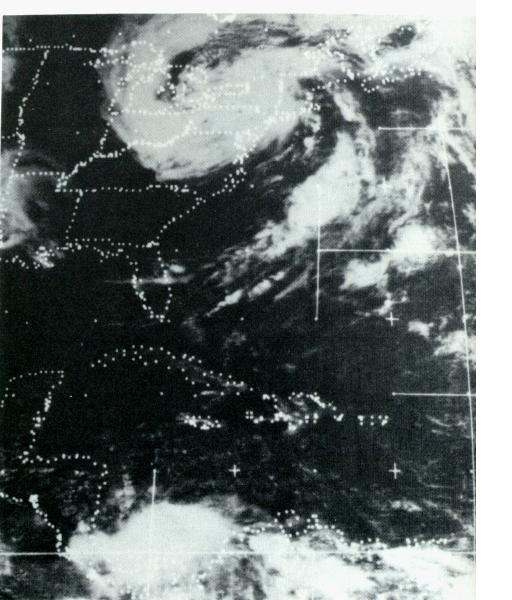
Remnants of Agnes over the northeastern United States

Three hours later, the National Hurricane Center noted decreasing atmospheric pressures, and indicated that winds had reached gale-force winds and once again upgraded Agnes to a tropical storm. By early on June 22, Agnes emerged into the northwestern Atlantic Ocean, where it continued to re-intensify. At 1200 UTC, Agnes reached its minimum atmospheric pressure of 977 mbar (28.9 inHg), as reported by a reconnaissance aircraft. However, maximum sustained winds were at only 70 mph (110 km/h). Late on June 22, Agnes made its final landfall on Long Beach, New York, on Long Island, with winds of 65 mph (100 km/h).

Agnes changed into an extratropical cyclone once cold air invaded its circulation late on June 22, completing its extratropical transition on the next day. The system looped across south-central Pennsylvania on June 23 and then looped across southern Ontario on June 25. It spawned a tornado in Maniwaki, Québec, early that day, which killed two and injured 11 people. The cyclone sped east-northeast, reaching Cape Breton Island on June 27 before intensifying as it re-entered the North Atlantic. After moving as far north as the 61st parallel while crossing the 25th meridian west on the morning of June 29, Agnes turned southeastward. Its central pressure bottomed out near 980 millibars (29 inHg) towards 0000 UTC on June 30. Between July 1 and July 3, the long-lived system looped between Ireland and Iceland while weakening once more. The system turned northeast, strengthening one more time while accelerating across the Hebrides on July 4 through 5. A stronger system moving in from the west finally absorbed Agnes on July 6, while located to the southeast of Iceland.

== Preparations ==
By 2200 UTC on June 17, the National Weather Service issued gale warnings and a hurricane watch for the Straits of Florida and the Florida Keys from Key West to Dry Tortugas. On the following day at 1600 UTC, another hurricane watch was put into effective from Cedar Key to Pensacola. In addition, the gale warnings in the Florida Keys were extended to include areas from Fort Myers Beach to Clearwater. At 2200 UTC on June 18, a hurricane warning became effective from St. Marks to Panama City. The gale warnings which were in effect for the Florida Keys and Fort Myers Beach to Clearwater was discontinued at 1000 UTC on June 19. It is likely that the hurricane warning was discontinued after the National Hurricane Center downgraded Agnes to a tropical storm at 2200 UTC on June 20. Two hours later, all gale warnings along the West Coast of Florida were discontinued.

== Impact ==
Death Tolls by Area
Area	Deaths
Canada	2
Cuba	7
Florida	9
North Carolina	2
Virginia	13
Delaware	1
Maryland	19
New Jersey	1
New York	24
Pennsylvania	50
Total	128

=== United States ===
In the United States, Agnes affected 15 states and the District of Columbia. Almost 110,000 houses were ruined by Agnes, 3,351 of which were destroyed. In addition, 5,211 mobile homes were either damaged or completely destroyed. Farm buildings and small businesses also suffered extensively, with 2,226 and 5,842 structures experiencing major losses or were destroyed. Of the 128 storm-related fatalities, 119 occurred in the United States. Agnes was, at the time, the costliest hurricane on record in U.S. history; losses far exceeded the combined losses from Hurricane Betsy (1965) and Hurricane Camille (1969).

==== Florida ====
Upon landfall, Agnes produced abnormally high tides along much of the Florida coastline. The highest tides reported were at Cedar Key, reaching 7 feet (2.1 m) above normal sea levels. The second largest waves were 6.4 feet (2.0 m), recorded at Apalachicola. In contrast, few observations of high tides along the east coast of Florida exist; the highest reported was 3 feet (0.91 m) above average in Jacksonville. In Alligator Point, at least 16 homes were swept off their foundations. Six bridges connecting Cedar Key to the mainland areas of Florida were submerged. In addition, a bridge from Coquina Key to St. Petersburg was also underwater due to high tides. Tampa Bay had an unusually high tide flooding the low lying Shore Acres neighborhood in St. Petersburg. Nearly the entire state of Florida reported rainfall, though it was usually in the light to moderate range. Among the highest amounts of precipitation recorded were 8.97 inches (228 mm) in Naples, 8.43 inches (214 mm) in Big Pine Key, 7.3 inches (190 mm) in the Everglades, and 7.17 inches (182 mm) in Tallahassee. Near Okeechobee, larger amounts of rainfall may have occurred, though there were no specific observations in that vicinity.

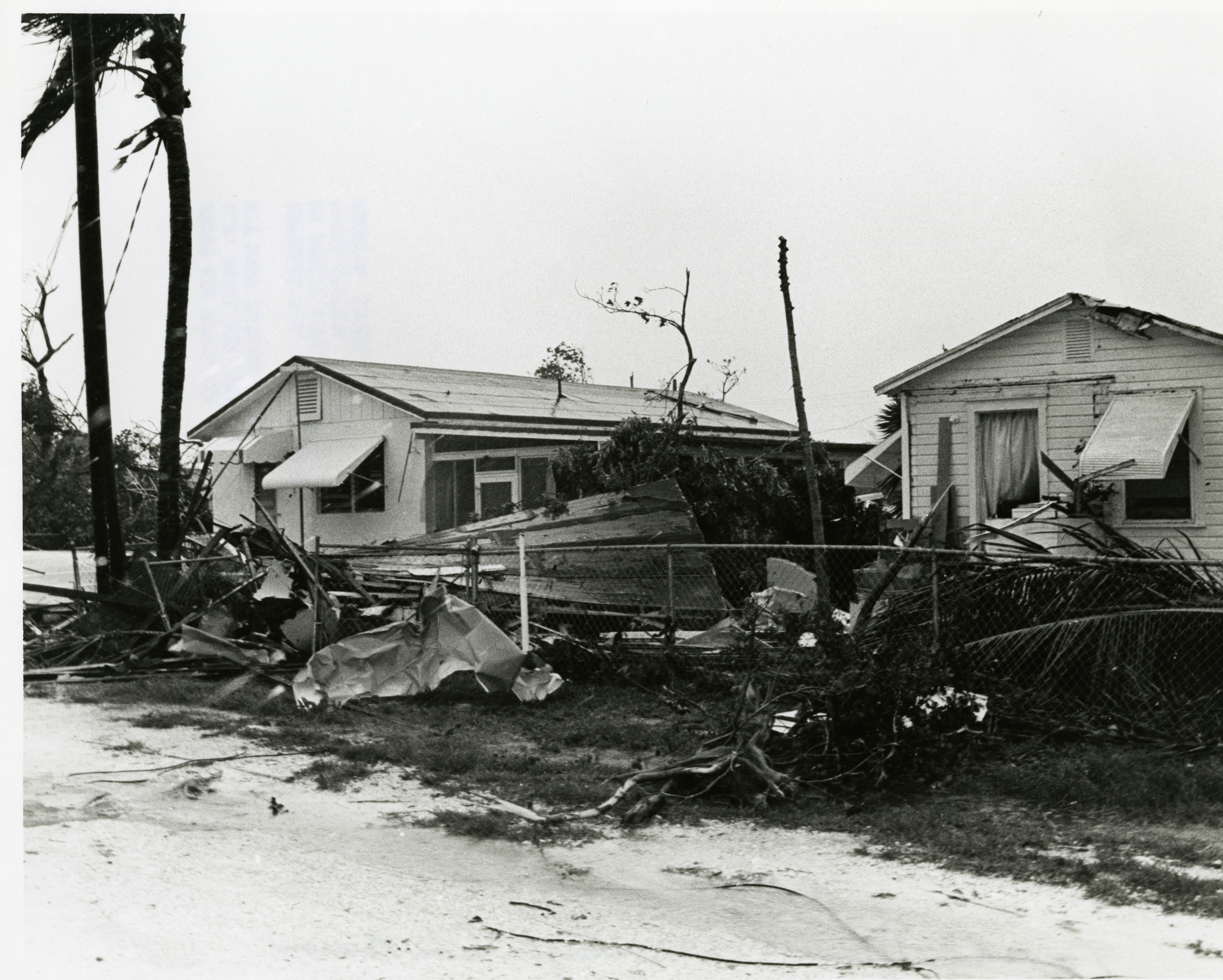
Damage in Key West, Florida, from a tornado spawned by Agnes

Though Agnes made landfall as a hurricane, no reports of hurricane-force winds exist. However, several locations observed tropical storm force winds. The highest sustained winds and gusts were 52 and 69 mph (84 and 111 km/h), both recorded at the Kennedy Space Center. Other reports of at least tropical storm force sustained winds were at 39 mph (63 km/h) in Crestview and Jacksonville, 42 mph (68 km/h) in Flamingo, 43 mph (69 km/h) in Key West, and two observations of 40 mph (64 km/h) in Panama City. Throughout the state, Agnes spawned at least 15 tornadoes, while several tornadoes were operationally unconfirmed. Initially referred to as a "windstorm", one of those twisters destroyed 50 mobile homes and a fishing camp in Okeechobee, as well as caused six fatalities. Another significant tornado occurred in Cape Canaveral, which destroyed two homes and 30 trailers; it also damaged 20 houses and the Port Canaveral Coast Guard station. Overall, more than 100 people were left homeless and caused 23 injuries and over $500,000 in damage. The costliest tornado was also spawned in Brevard County and it destroyed 44 planes at the Merritt Island Airport and an apartment building. In addition, several houses in a nearby subdivision were also damaged. Losses from this tornado are estimated at $3 million.

Due to a combination of high tides, rainfall, winds, and tornadoes, 96 dwellings were destroyed, while about 1,802 suffered damage to some degree. The destruction of 177 mobile homes was reported and 374 others were significantly damaged. Furthermore, 988 small businesses in the state were either destroyed or had major damage. Eight counties in Florida reported at least $1 million in damage, including $12.1 million in Pinellas, $7.1 million in Sarasota, $4.1 million in Brevard, $3.1 million in Pasco, $2 million in Manatee, $1.4 million in Wakulla and Franklin, $1.3 million in Monroe, and $1 million in losses in Hillsborough Counties. Although the damage toll estimated by the National Hurricane Center was at $8.243 million, the National Climatic Data Center noted that at least $39 million in losses were reported. In addition, nine fatalities were reported in Florida.

==== Southeastern United States ====
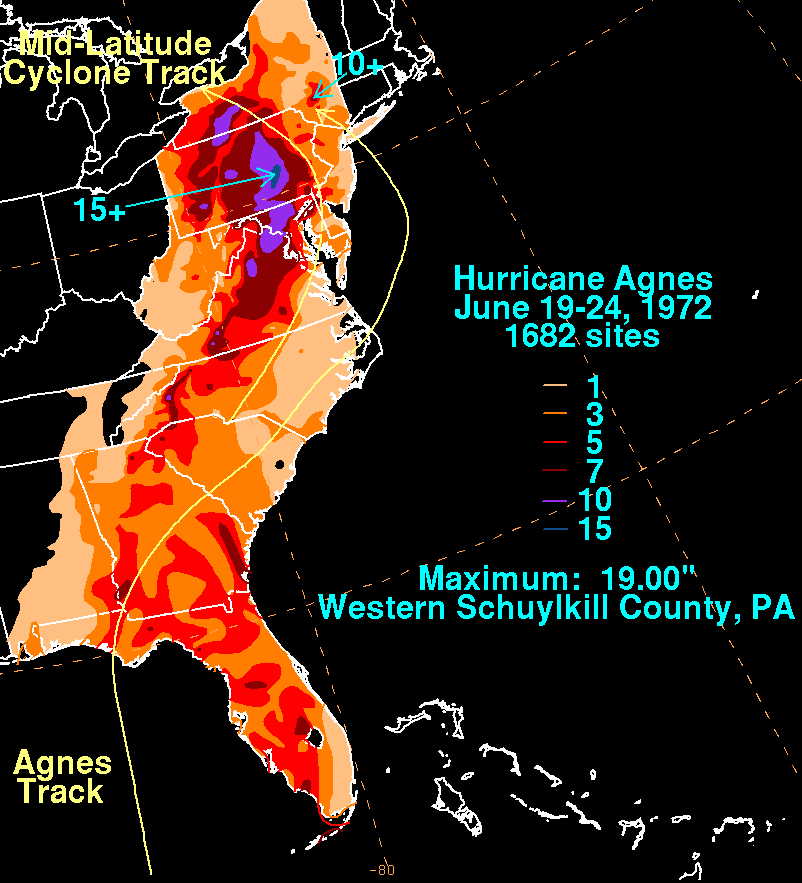
Rainfall accumulations in association with Hurricane Agnes

In the states immediately to the north of Florida, impact was relatively minor. Rainfall was generally light in Georgia, though peaking at 8.55 inches (217 mm) in Brunswick. Other locations that reported precipitations include 4.54 inches (115 mm) in Albany, 3.95 inches (100 mm) in Savannah, and 3.18 inches (81 mm) in Macon. During the tornado outbreak, two of the tornadoes were spawned in Georgia. The tornado in Pierce County caused $25,000 in damage and one injury. Losses were more significant from the twister in Coffee County, reaching $250,000. One mobile home in Georgia suffered significant damage, though it is unknown if this was related to the tornadoes. Though the damage from both tornadoes combined was about $275,000, the National Hurricane Center notes only $205,000 in losses.

In Alabama, tides up to 1.3 feet (0.40 m) above normal were reported in the Mobile Bay area. Though rainfall only reached 3.93 inches (100 mm) and 1.08 inches (27 mm) in Dothan and Mobile, precipitation from the storm in the state of Alabama peaked at 7.67 inches (195 mm) in Headland. Damage in the state was minor, though low-lying streets in the Gulf Shores were flooded.

In some areas of South Carolina, the storm dropped as much as 9.5 inches (240 mm) of rain in less than 36 hours. As a result, several rivers flooded. Along the Pee Dee River, pastures, small grains, and soy bean crops near Cheraw suffered major damage; similar effects occurred along the Congaree River near Columbia, though damage was lesser. In Greenville, damage to basements, streets, and water systems occurred after the Reedy River overflowed. Damage in South Carolina was minor, totaling to only $50,000.

Effects were very minimal in Tennessee and limited to light rainfall in the eastern portions of the state, generally reaching no more than 3 inches (76 mm). The highest amount of precipitation recorded was 4.59 inches (117 mm) in Unicoi.

==== Virginia ====
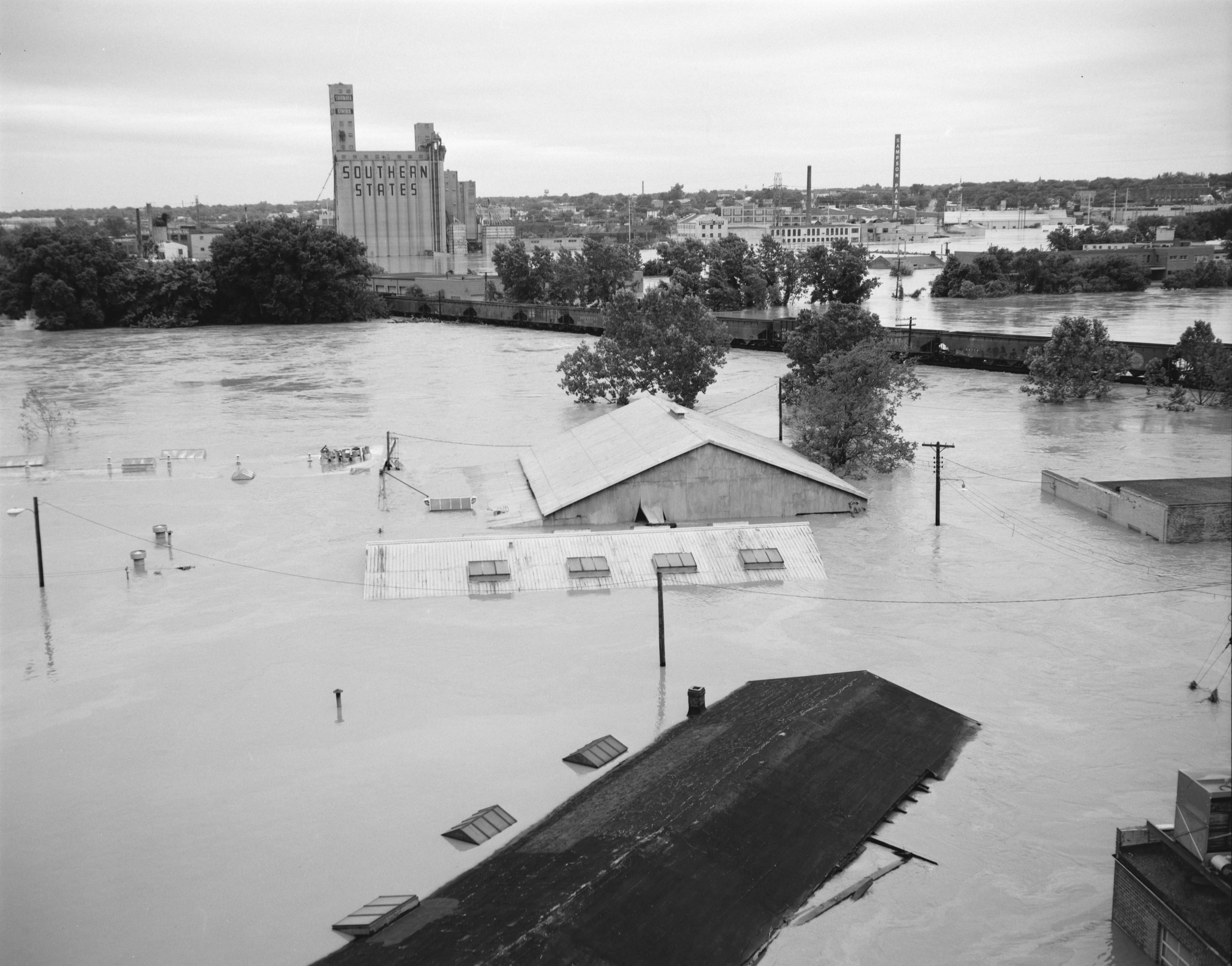
Buildings almost fully submerged in Richmond

In Richmond, four people drowned after their car plunged into the swollen James River. A train bound for Washington D.C. stopped due to flooding in Richmond, which temporarily stranded 537 passengers. The Peak Creek in western Virginia overflowed its banks, flooding a low-income housing area of Pulaski with water up to rooftops. At the height of the flooding, over 600 miles (970 km) of highways were submerged, resulting in $14.8 million in damage to roads in the state. Severe damage also occurred to sewer and water facilities, totaling to $34.5 million. 95 houses were destroyed and 4,393 others were damaged, while 125 mobile homes were destroyed and another 450 were significantly affected. Additionally, 205 small businesses were either damaged or destroyed. The Interstate 95 (I-95) Purple Heart Bridge over northern Virginia's Occoquan River was severely damaged and closed when rammed by a large barge carried by floodwaters. In the Washington DC suburbs, the Alexandria reservoir Lake Barcroft emptied when its dam was undermined and breached.

Overall, flooding was described as "the worst in 50 years". In Virginia alone, 13 fatalities and $125.9 million in losses were reported.

==== Maryland ====
In Baltimore, a woman's car was swept off a highway; firemen in rowboats were able to rescue her, but her three children drowned. In the state of Maryland, damage totaled to $110 million and 19 fatalities were reported.

The hardest hit area was the Patapsco River valley, with widespread destruction of buildings, roads, and railroads in the state park, at Daniels including its mill, at Ellicott City, and Oella. The flooding was first reported in the early morning hours of June 22 and water was reported as high as 40 feet (12 m) above normal. River Road along the Patapsco was almost completely washed out. More than 900 people were evacuated from their homes. National guard helicopters were used to rescue workmen from the roof of the Daniels' plant. In Elkridge, a family of six was forced from their home and they attempted to reach high ground in a small boat. It capsized and all six held onto the boat for several hours until it reached more shallow water.

In Howard County, a total of 704 county residents were left homeless. More than 80 homes in the Ellicott City area were damaged and 72 homes in Elkridge were affected. In Laurel, the 9th Street Bridge crossing the Patuxent River was washed away by flood waters. In Anne Arundel County, all roads linking the county with Baltimore city or county were closed (including the Baltimore Beltway) as were all roads "near the Patuxent River" including Waysons Corner where over 300 homes were evacuated. The Patapsco flooded residential homes in parts of the county's North Linthicum, Pumphrey, and Belle Grove Road, Brooklyn Park neighborhoods.

The Gwynn Oak Amusement Park closed after suffering severe damage from flooding when Hurricane Agnes caused Gwynns Falls to overflow. In 1974, the park's rides were auctioned off. The carousel was moved and is still in operation on the National Mall in Washington, D.C.

A popular footbridge in the Chesapeake and Ohio Canal National Historical Park which led across a branch of the Potomac River to an overlook of Great Falls was washed away and not rebuilt until 1996.

As a result of Agnes' rains, Conowingo Dam, astride the Susquehanna River just north of the Chesapeake Bay, recorded its all-time highest flow rate and stream heights. Before the river crested, the water came within feet of overtopping the dam. As the dam's normal flood control devices seemed unable to cope, engineers had placed charges to blow out a section of the dam to prevent a catastrophic failure. The towns along the Susquehanna below the canal, Port Deposit, Perryville, and Havre de Grace, were flooded as torrents of water rushed through streets. Late on June 23, a mandatory evacuation of Port Deposit's nearly 1,000 residents was ordered as the river continued to rise, causing the fire department to bring evacuees out by boat during an eight-hour period as over four-feet of water filled Main Street.

==== Pennsylvania ====
In Pennsylvania, heavy rainfall was reported, with much of the state experiencing more than 7 inches (180 mm) of precipitation. Furthermore, a large swath of rainfall exceeding 10 inches (250 mm) was reported in the central part of the state. Overall, the rains peaked at 19 inches (480 mm) in the western portions of Schuylkill County. As a result, Agnes is listed as the wettest tropical cyclone on record for the state of Pennsylvania. Overall, more than 100,000 people were forced to leave their homes due to flooding. The Allegheny River reached above flood stage at several low-lying locations and at some places rose about 7 in (180 mm) per hour during the height of the storm. Additionally, the Susquehanna River threatened to reach record crests along its course. Some buildings were under 13 ft (4.0 m) of water in Harrisburg. At the Governor's Mansion, the first floor was submerged by flood waters. Governor Milton Shapp and his wife Muriel had to be evacuated by boat due to flooding. More than one hundred Harrisburg YMCA campers and staff were evacuated using two CH-47 Chinook helicopters flown by the National Guard at Camp Shikellimy located downstream of DeHart Dam in Middle Paxton Township.

Hundreds were trapped in their homes in Wilkes-Barre due to the overflowing Susquehanna River. At the historic cemetery in Forty Fort, 2,000 caskets were washed away, leaving body parts on porches, roofs, and in basements. In Luzerne County alone, 25,000 homes and businesses were either damaged or destroyed. Losses in that county totaled to $1 billion. A bridge collapsed in Danville, which caused two Penn Central diesel locomotives and several freight cars to fall into a swollen creek.

In Reading, the Schuylkill River reached a record flood of 31 feet 6 inches (9.60 m). Hundreds of people were evacuated and over a hundred homes destroyed. Floods reached as far inland as 3rd street in the heart of the city. In Chadds Ford Township in Delaware County, the Brandywine Creek crested at 16.5 feet (5.0 m), sending flood waters into the city. Water poured into the first floor of the Brandywine River Museum of Art in Chadds Ford Township, which threatened at least $2.5 million in N.C. Wyeth paintings, though they were quickly moved to the upper floors. Additionally, 36 Girl Scouts were rescued by state police while at a camp in York.

Throughout the state of Pennsylvania, Agnes demolished more than 3,000 businesses and 68,000 homes, while damaging numerous others. Consequently, at least 220,000 people were left homeless. The damage and death toll was the highest in Pennsylvania, with 50 fatalities and $2.3 billion in losses in that state alone, including more than $1 billion in damage to businesses, $500 million to roadways, $120 million to crops, and around $40 million to school districts. Approximately 150 bridges either became impassable or were swept away. Following Agnes, three news correspondents and the pilot died in a helicopter crash in Harrisburg on June 26, 1972, while reporting on the flooding. The victims were Del Vaughn of CBS News and Sid Brenner and Louis Clark of WCAU in Philadelphia, and the pilot, Mike Sedio. The helicopter lost its rotor some three hundred feet (90 m) above the Capital City Airport, crashed, and exploded on the runway.

Results by county of the 1972 Pennsylvania financial assistance referendum Yes: 80–90%; 70–80%; 60–70%; 50–60%

In November 1972, Pennsylvania voters approved an amendment to the Pennsylvania Constitution that gave Pennsylvania legislators the ability to give financial assistance to those affected by Agnes or by flooding in Chester in September 1971. The measure was needed because Pennsylvania's constitution only allowed for special consideration from the state to be given to the disabled, the elderly, and those poverty stricken. The amendment, when introduced in the Pennsylvania General Assembly, only covered Agnes, but a change to it in the Pennsylvania House of Representatives included the 1971 Chester flood.

==== Upstate New York ====
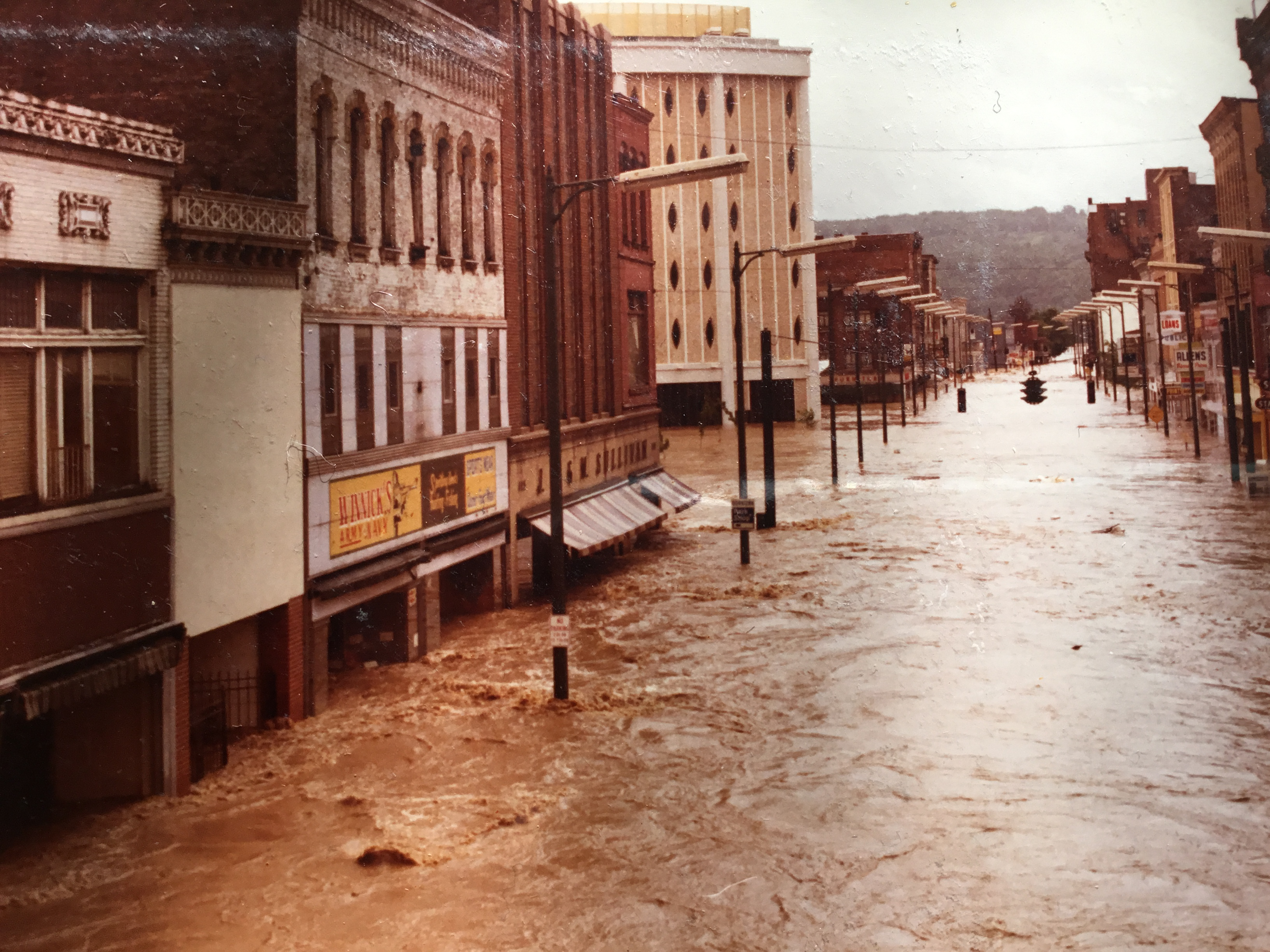
View from Erie Lackawanna train tracks, looking down Water Street in Elmira New York during the Flood of 1972. The Chemung Canal Trust Company building can be seen in the background.

Olean, Elmira, and Corning, as well as many other Southern Tier towns, were severely flooded. Sections of the Erie Lackawanna Railroad main line between Hornell and Binghamton were severely damaged. It is mainly regarded as the death of the Erie Lackawanna Railroad since the costs of damages were high and put the final dagger into the company. Flooding in the upper Allegheny River basin was particularly exacerbated by the construction of the Kinzua Dam less than a decade prior; several towns in Cattaraugus County suffered extensive road and bridge damage that, four decades later, had yet to be repaired, with the state and local governments opting to abandon creek and river crossings instead of reconstruct them. The dam succeeded in preventing further damage downstream in western Pennsylvania, and much of the flood-prone areas in the Allegheny Reservoir region had already been cleared of residents in preparation for the dam's construction.

In Elmira, porches and garages were ripped loose, the Walnut St. bridge was carried away, Maple Ave. to Notre Dame High School was "underwater", and on S. Main St., Gerould's Pharmacy at W. Hudson was engulfed by 10 feet 3 inches (3.12 m) of water.

Hornell's damage was minimal largely due to the protection of two dam systems installed after the devastating 1935 flood. Both the Arkport and Almond Dams saved Hornell from the level of damage found in neighboring communities. Three US Army Corps of Engineers were killed in Hornell when their helicopter came in contact with power lines over Crosby Creek.

The height of the floodwaters has been marked in the entrance to the Corning Museum of Glass, showing that much of the museum was under water to a height of about 1.6 metres (5.2 ft) above the floor, causing substantial damage to the collection and archives. Parts of Corning were under more than 3 metres (9.8 ft) of flood waters.

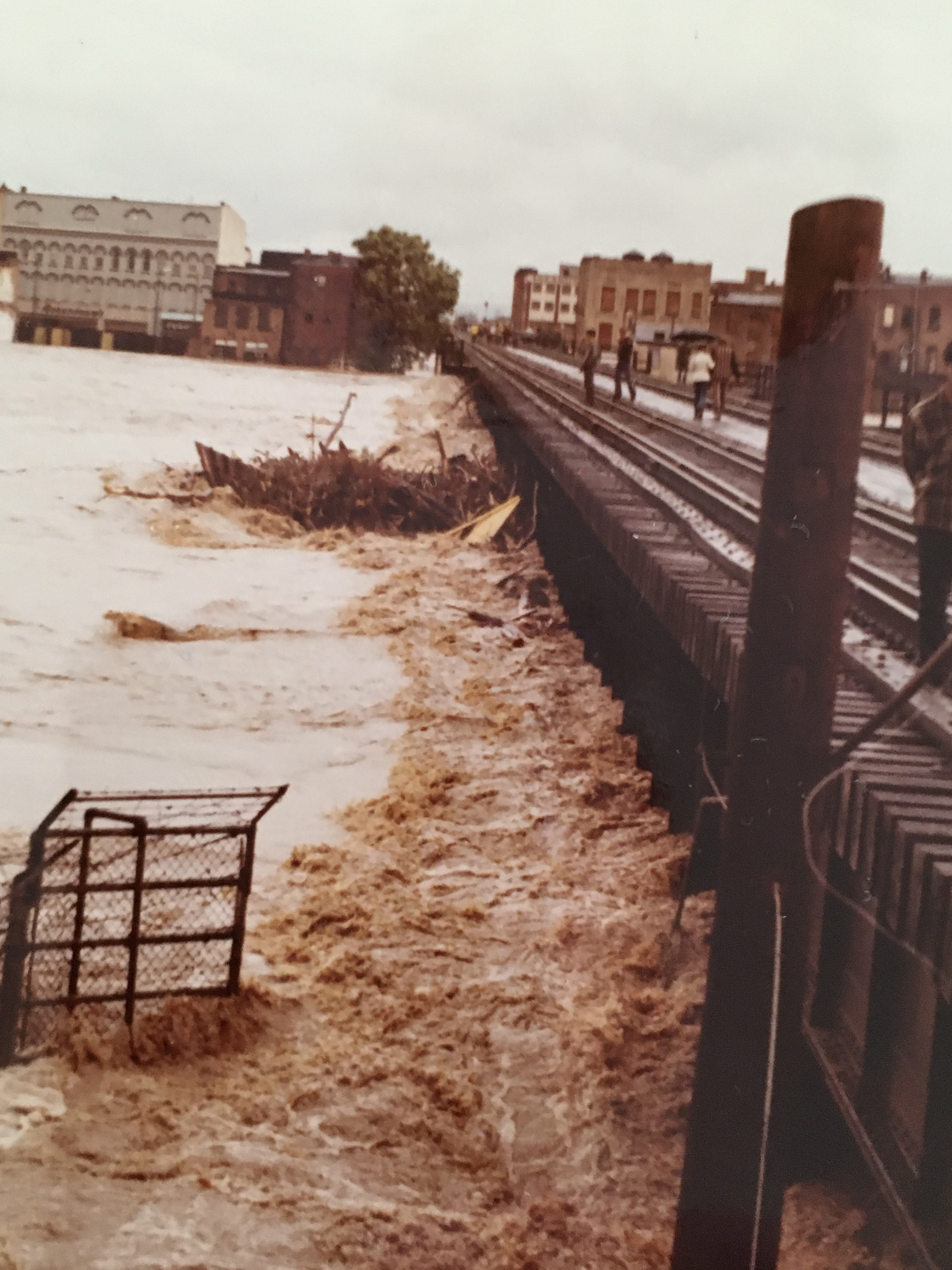
View from the northern end of the Erie-Lackawanna railroad bridge crossing the Chemung River during the Flood of 1972.

==== West Virginia and Ohio ====
Rainfall in West Virginia was generally light, though heavier in the Eastern and Northern Panhandles of the state. Precipitation peaked at 7.94 inches (202 mm) in Berkeley Springs. 108 houses were destroyed and 1,558 others suffered damage. Furthermore, 118 mobile homes were destroyed and 91 were significantly affected. 10 farm buildings reported major losses, while 18 small businesses were either damaged or destroyed. In the state of West Virginia, no fatalities were reported and damage was slightly more than $7.7 million.

Although no reports of abnormally high winds or rainfall exists in Ohio, the storm caused minor damage to about 302 dwellings and severely affected at least three houses. In addition, at least 100 mobile homes suffered major damage. Northeasterly winds from the storm waves reaching a height of 15 feet (4.6 m) along the shore of Lake Erie and also caused the water level to rise by 3.5 feet (1.1 m). Houses, cars, boats, buildings, ships, and docks in the vicinity of Lake Erie were damaged. Overall, losses in Ohio totaled to at least $4 million.

==== Elsewhere in the United States ====
While approaching Delaware, Agnes produced tides about 1.5 feet (0.46 m) above normal at the Indian River Inlet. High winds were also reported in the state, and at the Dover Air Force Base, a wind gust as high as 67 mph (108 km/h) was reported. Rainfall was generally light, peaking at 7.6 inches (190 mm) in Middletown. Street flooding was reported and basements in low-lying area were flooded, though damage in Delaware was minimal. One fatality occurred in that state. In the Washington, D.C. area, moderate rainfall was reported, with precipitation amounts peaking at 13.65 inches (347 mm) at the Washington Dulles International Airport. Significant flooding occurred and it was described as the worst in at least 44 years. In the Georgetown section, waterfront streets along the Potomac River were submerged in as much as 7 feet (2.1 m) of water. The Rock Creek also overflowed its banks, which sent about 10 feet (3.0 m) of water onto the Rock Creek Parkway. As a result, at least 100 cars were abandoned and several motorists required rescuing by police. No national monuments were affected by flood waters. However, about 350 dwellings in Washington, D.C. suffered minor damage. At the White House, reporters noted wet carpets in the press room of the basement floor.

In Connecticut, winds were well below tropical storm force, although a wind gust of 46 mph (74 km/h) was reported in Hartford. Rainfall in the state was modestly heavy, with 3.00 inches (76 mm) the three day total at Bridgeport. Along the coast of Connecticut, high tides and heavy rainfall flooded coastal roads and basements. High tides occurred along the coastline of Rhode Island, reaching 3.2 feet (0.98 m) above normal in Providence. In combination with rainfall and high tides, some coastal roads were flooded. Strong winds felled trees and numerous limbs in Massachusetts, causing power outages and property damage in the western and central portions of the state. One home in Great Barrington was struck by a tree; a similar incident occurred in Milford. High winds in southern and eastern Vermont knocked over trees and snapped off limbs, which resulted in scattered power outages, roads being blocked, and minor property damage. In Mendon, a tree fell on a house, while two cars were damaged after being struck by limbs. Similar conditions occurred in New Hampshire, albeit effects were lesser.

=== Elsewhere ===
As a precaution, more than 8,000 people in western Cuba, including on Isla de la Juventud (Isle of Pines), were evacuated. In western Cuba, Agnes dropped heavy rainfall, peaking at 16.76 inches (426 mm) on Isla de la Juventud. At Cape San Antonio, the westernmost point in Cuba, precipitation reached 15.32 inches (389 mm). Due to high winds and flooding, at least 97 houses were destroyed and another 270 were damaged. In the Pinar del Río Province, the cities of Guane and Mantua were isolated by swollen rivers. It was also reported that extensive crop damage occurred in low-lying areas. Overall, seven fatalities occurred in Cuba, though the damage toll is unknown. However, some sources claim Agnes caused 16 fatalities and reported 24 people injured.

In Canada, Hurricane Agnes gave heavy rains and winds over southern Ontario and southern Quebec, causing numerous floodings around Lake Erie and Lake Ontario. In the town of Maniwaki, Quebec, the storm toppled a mobile home, killing two people.

== Aftermath ==
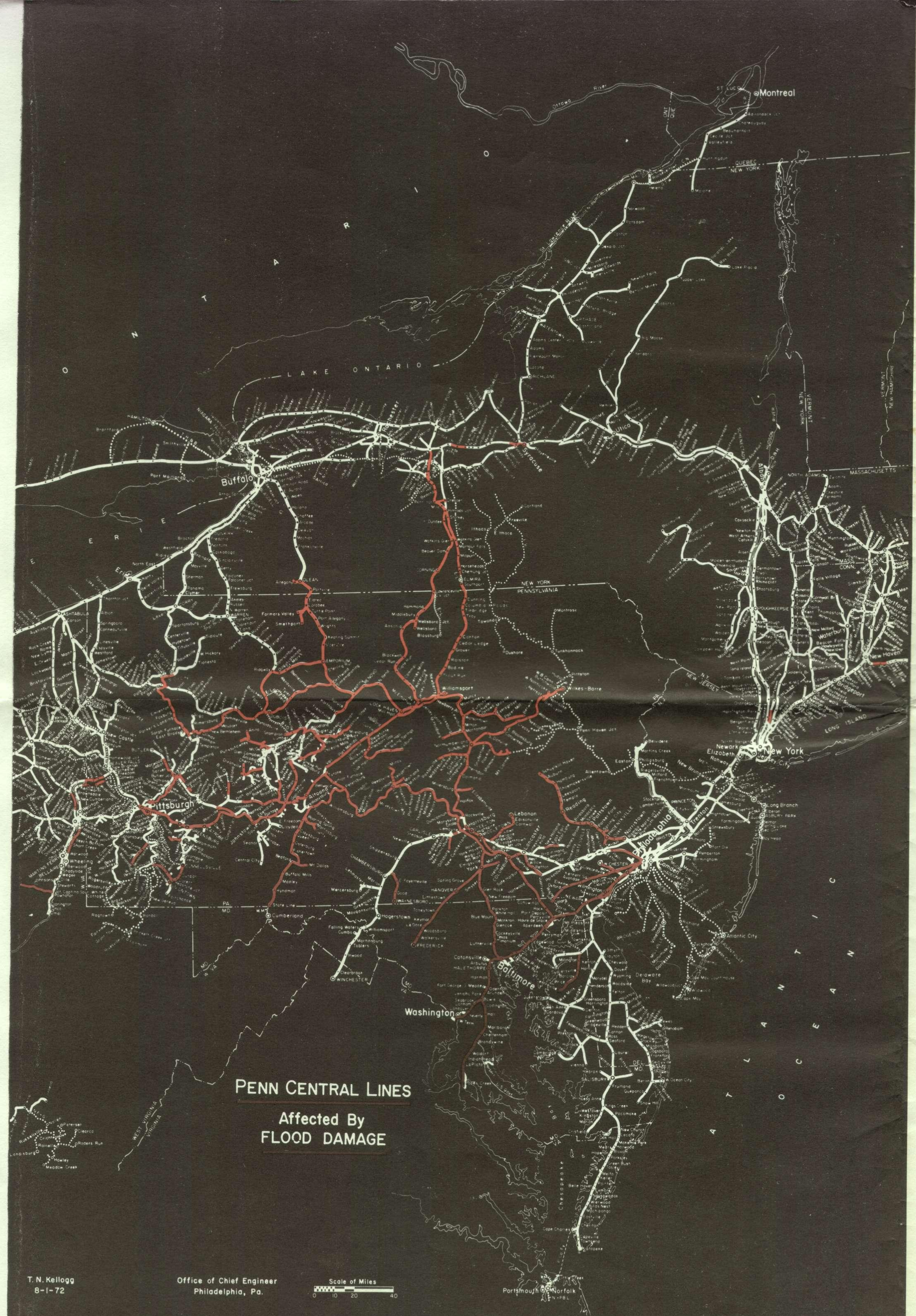
Map of Penn Central lines affected in the storm

Following the storm, President Richard Nixon declared 14 counties in Florida as a disaster area, including: Brevard County, Dixie County, Franklin County, Hendry County, Hillsborough County, Lee County, Levy County, Manatee County, Monroe County, Okeechobee County, Pasco County, Pinellas County, Sarasota County, and Wakulla County. In Panama City, Florida, where over 25,000 tourists evacuated, effects were not significant. As a result, the city lost millions of dollars from tourism, which led the officials of Panama City to file a $100 million lawsuit against the National Weather Service. Officials in that city believed that the National Weather Service and other media outlets made "exaggerated and erroneous" forecasts and reports on the storm. Nixon also declared the states of Florida, Virginia, Maryland, Pennsylvania, and New York as disaster areas. Twenty of Maryland's 24 counties were declared a disaster area.

Agnes had a devastating impact on the already-bankrupt railroads in the northeastern United States, as lines were washed out and shipments were delayed:

- The Erie Lackawanna Railway (EL) estimated that damage between Binghamton and Salamanca, New York, amounted to $2 million. EL filed for Chapter 7 bankruptcy.
- The Penn Central Railroad sustained nearly $20 million in damages

The resulting cost of repairing the damage was one of the factors leading to the creation of the federally financed Conrail. Some Americans sardonically referred to the storm as "Hurricane Agony".

The severe floods near Lawrenceville, Pennsylvania, were the catalyst for the construction of the Tioga Reservoir in 1973. The flooding in Wilkes-Barre, Pennsylvania, and the adjacent town of Kingston led to the construction of a levee system that in 2006 successfully prevented massive flooding and, in the same year, was deemed very safe and protective by the Army Corps of Engineers. The levee also protected the area from the remnants of Tropical Storm Lee and Hurricane Irene in 2011, with the water cresting just barely below the height of the structure. Conversely, the existing Kinzua Dam, built against the wishes of the Seneca Nation of New York, spared much of Western Pennsylvania from the worst flooding, by filling the Allegheny Reservoir to capacity.

Footage is included in the 1987 film Disasters-Anatomy of Destruction, hosted by George Kennedy.

=== Retirement ===
On account of the extensive damage and high death toll, the name Agnes was retired after the 1972 season. The name will never again be used for an Atlantic basin tropical cyclone.

== See also ==
- List of Atlantic hurricanes
- List of wettest tropical cyclones in the United States
- Timeline of the 1972 Atlantic hurricane season
- List of Delaware hurricanes
- Hurricane Sandy – made landfall in southern New Jersey as an extratropical cyclone in late October 2012
- Hurricane Hermine (2016) – took a similar path in early September 2016
- Hurricane Helene (2024) – caused similar flooding issues further south.

== Sources ==
- J. F. Bailey, J. L. Patterson, and J. L. H. Paulhus. Geological Survey Professional Paper 924. Hurricane Agnes Rainfall and Floods, June–July 1972. United States Government Printing Office: Washington D.C., 1975.

Preceded by Betsy	Costliest Atlantic hurricanes on Record; 1972	Succeeded by Alicia
