= List of Category 3 Pacific hurricanes =

Hurricane Rachel, which peaked as a Category 3 on October 1, 2026.

Category 3 is the third-highest classification on the Saffir–Simpson hurricane wind scale, and categorizes tropical cyclones with 1-minute maximum sustained winds between 96 and 112 knots (110 and 129 mph; 178 and 207 km/h; 49 and 58 m/s). Tropical cyclones that attain such winds and move over land while maintaining those winds are capable of causing severe damage to human lives and infrastructure. From 1949 to 2026, a total of 89 recorded Pacific hurricanes have peaked at Category 3 strength within the Northeast Pacific tropical cyclone basin, which is denoted as the part of the Pacific Ocean north of the equator and east of the International Date Line. This does not include storms that also attained Category 4 or 5 status on the scale.

The development of Category 3 hurricanes in the Northeast Pacific basin is influenced by many factors. During the Northern Hemisphere winter and spring months of December to April, sea surface temperatures in the tropics are usually too low to support tropical cyclogenesis. Furthermore, from January to April, the North Pacific High and Aleutian Low induce strong vertical wind shear and unfavorable conditions that serve to prevent the development of hurricanes. These effects are reduced or even disappear during hurricane season from May to November, when sea surface temperatures are also high enough to support tropical cyclogenesis; the bulk of recorded Category 3 hurricanes developed during June to October. Global weather patterns may also influence hurricane development in the Northeast Pacific. El Niño events result in increased numbers of powerful hurricanes through weaker wind shear and higher sea surface temperatures within the basin, while La Niña events reduce the number of such hurricanes through the opposite.

== Background ==
Saffir–Simpson scale
TD	TS	C1	C2	C3	C4	C5

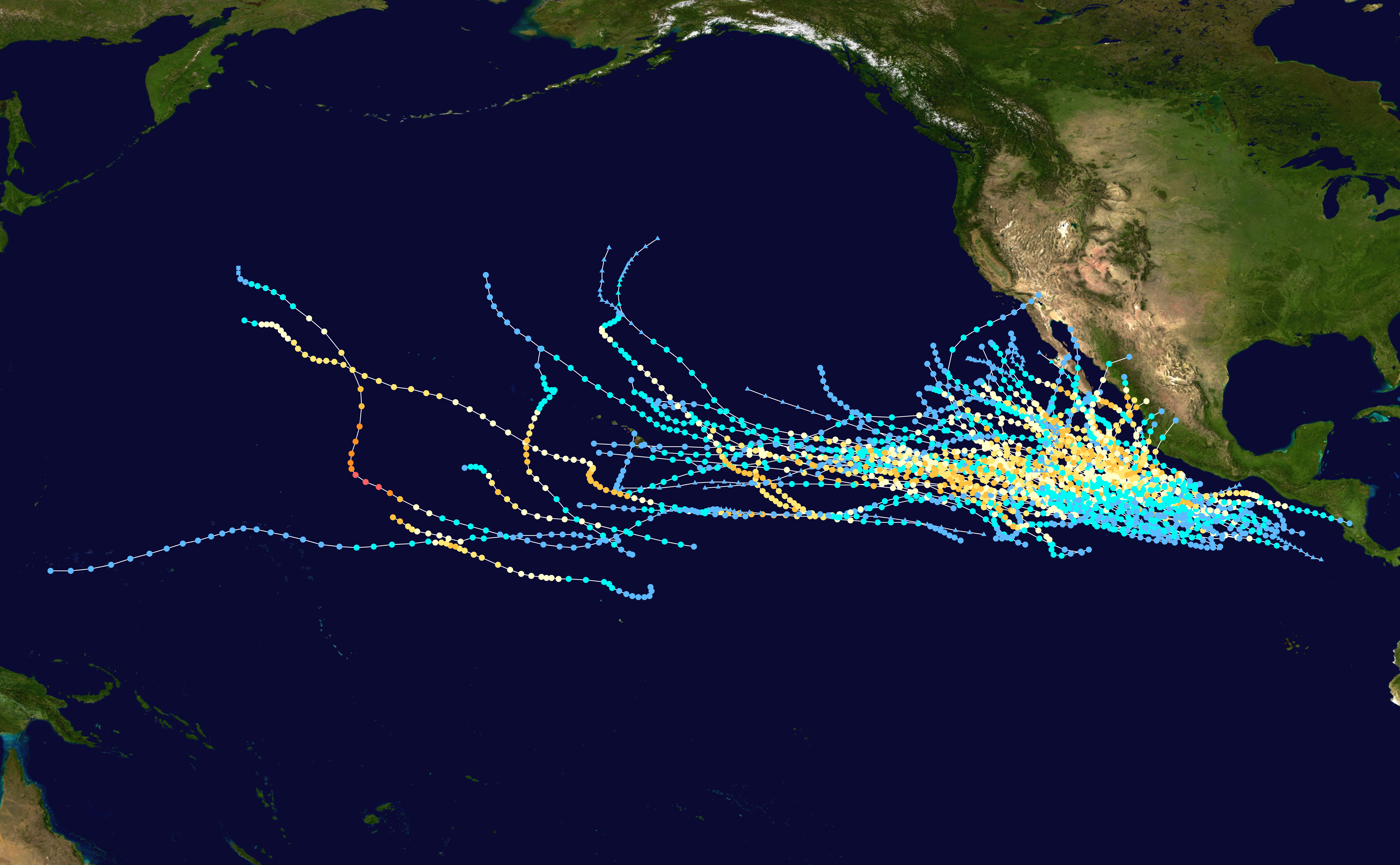
Tracks of all known Category 3 Pacific hurricanes from 1949 to 2015 in the Northeast Pacific basin

On the Saffir–Simpson scale, a hurricane reaches Category 3 status when it attains maximum sustained winds of between 96 and 112 knots (110 and 129 mph; 178 and 207 km/h; 49 and 58 m/s). The National Hurricane Center (NHC) takes sustained winds to be the average wind speed measured over the period of one minute at the height of 10 metres (33 ft) above the ground. When a hurricane reaches Category 3 intensity, it is termed a "major hurricane" by the NHC, though this term is also used to describe hurricanes at Category 4 or 5 intensity. Should a Category 3 hurricane make landfall, its strongest winds can cause very severe damage to human infrastructure, with debris carried by the winds capable of bringing injury or death to humans and animals.

The Northeast Pacific tropical cyclone basin is defined as the region of the Pacific Ocean north of the equator and east of the International Date Line. The Northeast Pacific is further divided into two sub-basins, namely the east and central Pacific. The east Pacific runs east of the 140th meridian west, and tropical cyclones occurring there are warned upon by the National Hurricane Center, the current Regional Specialized Meteorological Center (RSMC) for that area. The central Pacific, running from the 140th meridian west to the International Date Line, currently has the Central Pacific Hurricane Center as its RSMC. Tropical cyclones are generally much rarer in the central Pacific than in the east Pacific, with an average of just four to five storms forming or moving into the central Pacific compared to around 15 for the east Pacific. All tropical cyclones recorded by past and present RSMCs of the Northeast Pacific basin since 1949 are listed in the Northeast and North Central Pacific hurricane database (HURDAT), which is compiled and maintained by the National Hurricane Center.

Before 1970, tropical cyclones within the Northeast Pacific were classified into three categories: tropical depression, tropical storm, and hurricane; these were assigned intensities of 30 mph (45 km/h), 50 mph (85 km/h), and 85 mph (140 km/h) respectively. Exceptions to these rules would be storms that affected humans and as such humans were able to measure or estimate wind speeds or pressure data. Due to this lack of specific intensity records, there has been only one confirmed Category 3 hurricane prior to 1970.

== Climatology ==
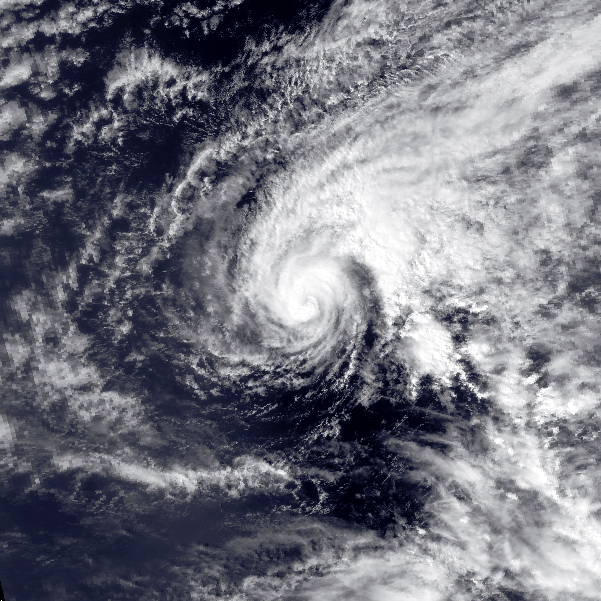
Hurricane Ekeka of 1992 near peak intensity on February 2. Ekeka is the only Category 3 Pacific hurricane to develop outside of the normal dates of the Pacific hurricane season.

Hurricane season in the Northeast Pacific tropical cyclone basin begins on May 15 in the east Pacific and June 1 in the central Pacific, and ends on November 30. Since 1949, a total of 89 Category 3 hurricanes have developed in the Northeast Pacific basin. Only one has occurred in the off-season: Hurricane Ekeka of 1992, which peaked in February. A total of two have done so in May, 7 in June, 22 in July, 24 in August, 16 in September, and 17 in October. None have done so in November.

The formation and development of tropical cyclones, termed tropical cyclogenesis, requires high sea surface temperatures of at least 26.5 °C (79.7 °F) and low vertical wind shear. When these conditions are met, a pre-existing tropical disturbance – usually a tropical wave – can develop into a tropical cyclone, provided the disturbance is far enough from the Equator to experience a sufficiently strong Coriolis force which is responsible for the counterclockwise rotation of hurricanes in the Northern Hemisphere. During the winter and spring months of December to April, sea surface temperatures in the tropics are usually too low to support development. Also, the presence of a semi-permanent high-pressure area known as the North Pacific High in the eastern Pacific greatly suppresses formation of tropical cyclones in the winter, as the North Pacific High results in vertical wind shear that causes environmental conditions to be unconducive to tropical cyclone formation. Another factor preventing tropical cyclones from forming during the winter is the presence of a semi-permanent low-pressure area called the Aleutian Low between January and April. Its effects in the central Pacific near the 160th meridian west cause tropical waves that form in the area to drift northward into the Gulf of Alaska and dissipate or become extratropical. Its retreat in late-April allows the warmth of the Pacific High to meander in, bringing its powerful clockwise wind circulation with it. The Intertropical Convergence Zone departs southward in mid-May permitting the formation of the earliest tropical waves, coinciding with the start of the eastern Pacific hurricane season on May 15. During summer and autumn, sea surface temperatures rise further to reach near 29 °C (84 °F) in July and August, well above the 26.5 °C (79.7 °F) threshold for tropical cyclogenesis. This allows for hurricanes developing during that time to strengthen significantly.

The El Niño-Southern Oscillation also influences the frequency and intensity of hurricanes in the Northeast Pacific basin. During years with the existence of an El Niño event, sea surface temperatures increase in the Northeast Pacific and average vertical wind shear decreases, resulting in an increase in activity; the opposite happens in the Atlantic basin during El Niño, where increased wind shear creates an unfavorable environment for tropical cyclone formation. Contrary to El Niño, La Niña increases wind shear and decreases sea surface temperatures over the eastern Pacific, while reducing wind shear and increasing sea surface temperatures over the Atlantic.

Within the Northeast Pacific, tropical cyclones generally head west out into the open Pacific Ocean, steered by the westward trade winds. Closer to the end of the season, however, some storms are steered northwards or northeastwards around the subtropical ridge nearer the end of the season, and may bring impacts to the western coasts of Mexico and occasionally even Central America. In the central Pacific basin, the North Pacific High keeps tropical cyclones away from the Hawaiian Islands by forcing them southwards. Combined with cooler waters around the Hawaiian Islands that tend to weaken approaching tropical cyclones, this makes direct impacts on the Hawaiian Islands by tropical cyclones rare.

== Systems ==
Key

- † Discontinuous duration (weakened below Category 3 then restrengthened to that classification at least once)
- ‡ Intensified past Category 3 intensity after exiting basin
- # Storm made landfall, see below for further information
- § Pressure listed was not at peak intensity (Note: Prior to 1988 for the Eastern Pacific and 2001 for the Central Pacific, pressure data was only available through direct measurements by reconnaissance aircraft that penetrated the storm or reports from ships and land-based weather stations, or estimates derived from satellite imagery. Should any reading or estimate be available, the lowest is listed below.)

Name	Dates as a Category 3 hurricane (Note: Dates are given in Coordinated Universal Time.)	Duration (hours)	Sustained wind speeds	Pressure	Areas affected	Deaths	Damage (USD) (Note: All damage values are in USD of their respective years.)	Refs
Olivia	October 14, 1967	6	125 mph (205 km/h)	939 hPa (27.73 inHg)	Baja California Sur#	2	Unknown	
Francene	July 19–20, 1971	24	115 mph (185 km/h)	991 hPa (29.26 inHg) §	No land areas	—N/a	—N/a	
Ilsa	August 3, 1971	12	115 mph (185 km/h)	978 hPa (28.88 inHg) §	No land areas	—N/a	—N/a	
Monica	September 1–2, 1971	18	115 mph (185 km/h)	1,005 hPa (29.68 inHg) §	No land areas	—N/a	—N/a	
Olivia (Note: Hurricane Olivia was a continuation of Hurricane Irene from the North Atlantic basin after Irene crossed from the Atlantic to the Eastern Pacific while remaining a tropical cyclone. Statistics listed here only cover the Eastern Pacific portion of Hurricane Irene–Olivia's lifespan.)	September 25–26, 1971†	12	115 mph (185 km/h)	948 hPa (27.99 inHg)	Baja California Peninsula#, Southwestern United States	None	$250,000	
Priscilla	October 10–11, 1971	24	125 mph (205 km/h)	951 hPa (28.08 inHg)	Nayarit#	None	$3.68 million	
Fernanda	August 24, 1972	6	115 mph (185 km/h)	948 hPa (27.99 inHg) §	No land areas	—N/a	—N/a	
Gwen	August 27–28, 1972	30	125 mph (205 km/h)	941 hPa (27.79 inHg) §	No land areas	—N/a	—N/a	
Hyacinth	August 31 – September 1, 1972	30	125 mph (205 km/h)	962 hPa (28.41 inHg) §	California	None	None	
Connie	June 14, 1974	6	125 mph (205 km/h)	942 hPa (27.82 inHg) §	No land areas	—N/a	—N/a	
Ione	August 25, 1974	6	115 mph (185 km/h)	954 hPa (28.17 inHg)	No land areas	—N/a	—N/a	
Carlotta	July 5–6, 1975	48	125 mph (205 km/h)	Unknown	No land areas	—N/a	—N/a	
Olivia	October 25, 1975	6	115 mph (185 km/h)	Unknown	Sinaloa# (particularly Mazatlán), Nayarit, Durango, Jalisco	30	$20 million	
Hyacinth	August 10–11, 1976	30	115 mph (185 km/h)	Unknown	No land areas	—N/a	—N/a	
Daniel	June 30 – July 1, 1978	30	115 mph (185 km/h)	Unknown	No land areas	—N/a	—N/a	
Gilma	July 16, 1978	6	115 mph (185 km/h)	Unknown	No land areas	—N/a	—N/a	
Dolores	July 20–21, 1979†	18	120 mph (195 km/h)	Unknown	No land areas	—N/a	—N/a	
Fefa	August 23, 1979	6	115 mph (185 km/h)	Unknown	No land areas	—N/a	—N/a	
Agatha	June 12, 1980	6	115 mph (185 km/h)	Unknown	No land areas	—N/a	—N/a	
Javier	August 25, 1980	18	115 mph (185 km/h)	Unknown	No land areas	—N/a	—N/a	
Norma	October 10–11, 1981	24	125 mph (205 km/h)	Unknown	Sinaloa#, Texas, Oklahoma	6	$74 million	
Daniel	July 11–12, 1982	24	115 mph (185 km/h)	Unknown	Hawaiian Islands	None	None	
Gilma	July 29–30, 1982	24	125 mph (205 km/h)	Unknown	Big Island	None	None	
John	August 6–8, 1982	36	115 mph (185 km/h)	Unknown	No land areas	—N/a	—N/a	
Sergio	October 17–18, 1982	48	125 mph (205 km/h)	Unknown	No land areas	—N/a	—N/a	
Lorena	September 8, 1983	12	115 mph (185 km/h)	Unknown	Guerrero, Colima	7	$33,000	
Manuel	September 17, 1983	12	115 mph (185 km/h)	Unknown	Baja California, Southwestern United States	None	Unknown	
Priscilla	October 4, 1983	18	115 mph (185 km/h)	Unknown	Southwestern United States	None	Unknown	
Genevieve	July 10–11, 1984	12	115 mph (185 km/h)	Unknown	Baja California Peninsula#	None	None	
Keli	August 20, 1984	6	115 mph (185 km/h)	Unknown	Johnston Atoll	None	None	
Polo	October 1–2, 1984	24	115 mph (185 km/h)	Unknown	Baja California Peninsula#	None	None	
Blanca	June 13–14, 1985	30	120 mph (195 km/h)	Unknown	No land areas	—N/a	—N/a	
Dolores	July 1, 1985	12	115 mph (185 km/h)	Unknown	No land areas	—N/a	—N/a	
Sandra	September 8–9, 1985	18	125 mph (205 km/h)	972 hPa (28.70 inHg) §	No land areas	—N/a	—N/a	
Terry	September 20–21, 1985†	12	115 mph (185 km/h)	Unknown	No land areas	—N/a	—N/a	
Xina	October 29, 1985	6	115 mph (185 km/h)	Unknown	No land areas	—N/a	—N/a	
Hilary	August 3–4, 1987	24	120 mph (195 km/h)	Unknown	No land areas	—N/a	—N/a	
Otis	September 22–24, 1987†	36	115 mph (185 km/h)	Unknown	No land areas	—N/a	—N/a	
Uleki	August 31 – September 3, 1988	72	120 mph (195 km/h)	Unknown	Hawaii	2	None	
Ismael	August 19–20, 1989	18	120 mph (195 km/h)	955 hPa (28.20 inHg)	Guerrero, Colima	3	None	
Kiko	August 26–27, 1989	18	120 mph (195 km/h)	955 hPa (28.20 inHg)	Baja California Sur#, Sonora	None	Unknown	
Iselle	July 24–26, 1990	54	120 mph (195 km/h)	958 hPa (28.29 inHg)	No land areas	—N/a	—N/a	
Julio	August 21–22, 1990	24	115 mph (185 km/h)	960 hPa (28.35 inHg)	No land areas	—N/a	—N/a	
Carlos	June 23–25, 1991	54	120 mph (195 km/h)	955 hPa (28.20 inHg)	No land areas	—N/a	—N/a	
Fefa	August 2, 1991	18	120 mph (195 km/h)	959 hPa (28.32 inHg)	Hawaii	None	Unknown	
Linda	October 5–6, 1991	18	120 mph (195 km/h)	957 hPa (28.26 inHg)	No land areas	—N/a	—N/a	
Ekeka	February 2, 1992	12	115 mph (185 km/h)	Unknown	No land areas	—N/a	—N/a	
Darby	July 6, 1992	18	120 mph (195 km/h)	968 hPa (28.59 inHg)	Guerrero	3	Unknown	
Winifred	October 9, 1992	6	115 mph (185 km/h)	960 hPa (28.35 inHg)	Colima#, Michoacán, Guerrero	3	$5 million	
Eugene	July 18–20, 1993	66	125 mph (205 km/h)	948 hPa (27.99 inHg)	Hawaii	1	None	
Hilary	August 21–22, 1993	24	120 mph (195 km/h)	957 hPa (28.26 inHg)	Baja California Peninsula#, Sonora#, California, Iowa	None	Unknown	
Fausto	September 12, 1996	18	120 mph (195 km/h)	955 hPa (28.20 inHg)	Baja California Sur#, Sinaloa#, Texas	1	$800,000	
Enrique	July 14, 1997	6	115 mph (185 km/h)	960 hPa (28.35 inHg)	No land areas	—N/a	—N/a	
Darby	July 25–28, 1998†	48	115 mph (185 km/h)	958 hPa (28.29 inHg)	No land areas	—N/a	—N/a	
Georgette	August 14, 1998	12	115 mph (185 km/h)	960 hPa (28.35 inHg)	No land areas	—N/a	—N/a	
Lester	October 22, 1998	12	115 mph (185 km/h)	965 hPa (28.50 inHg)	Southern Mexico, Guatemala, Honduras	2	Unknown	
Beatriz	July 12–14, 1999	36	120 mph (195 km/h)	955 hPa (28.20 inHg)	No land areas	—N/a	—N/a	
Daniel	July 25–28, 2000†	60	125 mph (205 km/h)	954 hPa (28.17 inHg)	Hawaii	None	None	
Alma	May 30, 2002	12	115 mph (185 km/h)	960 hPa (28.35 inHg)	No land areas	—N/a	—N/a	
Ele	August 29–30, 2002‡	6	125 mph (205 km/h)	945 hPa (27.91 inHg)	No land areas	—N/a	—N/a	
Darby	July 29, 2004	12	120 mph (195 km/h)	957 hPa (28.26 inHg)	Hawaii	None	Unknown	
Jova	September 19–21, 2005	60	125 mph (205 km/h)	951 hPa (28.08 inHg)	No land areas	—N/a	—N/a	
Bud	July 13, 2006	18	125 mph (205 km/h)	953 hPa (28.14 inHg)	No land areas	—N/a	—N/a	
Ileana	August 23–24, 2006	18	120 mph (195 km/h)	955 hPa (28.20 inHg)	Baja California Sur	1	Unknown	
Lane	September 16, 2006	18	125 mph (205 km/h)	952 hPa (28.11 inHg)	Guerrero, Michoacán, Colima, Jalisco, Sinaloa#, Texas	4	$112 million	
Hernan	August 9–10, 2008	18	120 mph (195 km/h)	956 hPa (28.23 inHg)	No land areas	—N/a	—N/a	
Guillermo	August 15, 2009	18	125 mph (205 km/h)	954 hPa (28.17 inHg)	No land areas	—N/a	—N/a	
Neki	October 21–22, 2009	24	125 mph (205 km/h)	950 hPa (28.05 inHg)	Papahānaumokuākea Marine National Monument	None	None	
Darby	June 25–26, 2010	30	120 mph (195 km/h)	959 hPa (28.32 inHg)	Chiapas	None	Unknown	
Jova	October 10–11, 2011	30	125 mph (205 km/h)	955 hPa (28.20 inHg)	Colima, Jalisco#	9	$204 million	
Bud	May 25, 2012	6	115 mph (185 km/h)	961 hPa (28.38 inHg)	Colima, Guerrero, Jalisco	None	Unknown	
Daniel	July 8, 2012	6	115 mph (185 km/h)	961 hPa (28.38 inHg)	No land areas	—N/a	—N/a	
Miriam	September 24–25, 2012	18	120 mph (195 km/h)	959 hPa (28.32 inHg)	Baja California Sur, Texas	None	None	
Paul	October 15–16, 2012	18	120 mph (195 km/h)	959 hPa (28.32 inHg)	Baja California Peninsula, Sonora, Sinaloa, Revillagigedo Islands	None	$15.5 million	
Raymond	October 21–22, 2013	18	125 mph (205 km/h)	951 hPa (28.08 inHg)	Guerrero, Michoacán	None	Unknown	
Genevieve	August 7, 2014‡	6	115 mph (185 km/h)	965 hPa (28.50 inHg)	No land areas	—N/a	—N/a	
Julio	August 8, 2014	18	120 mph (195 km/h)	960 hPa (28.35 inHg)	No land areas	—N/a	—N/a	
Norbert	September 6, 2014	12	125 mph (205 km/h)	950 hPa (28.05 inHg)	Colima, Jalisco, Sinaloa, Baja California Peninsula, Southwestern United States	5	$27.7 million	
Linda	September 8–9, 2015	18	125 mph (205 km/h)	950 hPa (28.05 inHg)	Sinaloa, Oaxaca, Zacatecas, Revillagigedo Islands, Southwestern United States	22	$3.73 million	
Darby	July 16–17, 2016	18	120 mph (195 km/h)	958 hPa (28.29 inHg)	Hawaii#	None	Unknown	
Eugene	July 9, 2017	6	115 mph (185 km/h)	966 hPa (28.53 inHg)	Southern California	None	None	
Otis	September 18, 2017	6	115 mph (185 km/h)	965 hPa (28.50 inHg)	No land areas	—N/a	—N/a	
Juliette	September 3–4, 2019	24	125 mph (205 km/h)	953 hPa (28.14 inHg)	Clarion Island	None	None	
Bonnie (Note: Hurricane Bonnie crossed from the Atlantic to the Eastern Pacific while remaining a tropical cyclone, so it keeps its Atlantic name. Statistics listed here only cover the Eastern Pacific portion of Hurricane Bonnie's lifespan.)	July 5, 2022	6	115 mph (185 km/h)	964 hPa (28.47 inHg)	Nicaragua, Costa Rica, Guatemala, El Salvador, Southern Mexico	1	Unknown	
Calvin	July 14–15, 2023	18	125 mph (205 km/h)	953 hPa (28.14 inHg)	Hawaii	None	Unknown	
John	September 24, 2024	3.25	120 mph (195 km/h)	956 hPa (28.23 inHg)	Guerrero#, Oaxaca, Michoacán#	29	$2.45 billion	
Flossie	July 2, 2025	12	120 mph (195 km/h)	958 hPa (28.29 inHg)	Southwestern Mexico, Socorro Island	1	Unknown	
Priscilla	October 7, 2025	6	115 mph (185 km/h)	954 hPa (28.17 inHg)	Baja California Peninsula, Southwestern United States	1	$58,100	
Rachel	October 1–2, 2026	18	120 mph (195 km/h)	950 hPa (28.05 inHg)	Southwestern Mexico, Revillagigedo Islands, Baja California Peninsula	None	Unknown	
Overall reference for name, dates, duration, winds, and pressure:

== Landfalls ==
Landfalls by month
Month	Number of storms
July	2
August	4
September	6
October	8

Of the 89 Category 3 hurricanes in the east and central Pacific, a total of 15 made landfall while still a tropical cyclone, collectively resulting in 20 landfalls. As tropical cyclones approach land, they tend to weaken due to land interaction, cooler waters, shallower waters due to shelving, increased vertical wind shear, or dry air. As such, only five of these 15 hurricanes have made landfall while still at Category 3 intensity: Olivia of 1967, Olivia of 1975, Kiko of 1989, Lane of 2006, and John of 2024. Only four made more than one landfall during their lifespan: Hilary of 1993, which made three landfalls, as well as Olivia of 1967, Fausto of 1996, and John of 2024, which made two landfalls each. Only two years – 1971 and 1984 – saw more than one Category 3 hurricane make landfall, though in neither year did any of those Category 3 hurricanes make landfall as hurricanes. In the following table, dates where storms made landfall are listed next to the landfall locations.

Name	Year	Category 3	Category 2	Category 1	Tropical storm	Tropical depression	Refs
Olivia	1967	Baja California Sur (October 14)	—	—	Baja California Sur (October 13)	—	
Olivia	1971	—	—	—	—	Baja California Sur (September 30)	
Priscilla	1971	—	—	—	Nayarit (October 12)	—	
Olivia	1975	Sinaloa (October 25)	—	—	—	—	
Norma	1981	—	Sinaloa (October 12)	—	—	—	
Genevieve	1984	—	—	—	—	Baja California Sur (July 14)	
Polo	1984	—	—	—	—	Baja California Sur (October 3)	
Kiko	1989	Baja California Sur (August 27)	—	—	—	—	
Winifred	1992	—	Colima (October 9)	—	—	—	
Hilary	1993	—	—	—	Baja California Sur (×2, both on August 25)	Sonora (August 26)	
Fausto	1996	—	—	Baja California Sur (September 13), Sinaloa (September 14)	—	—	
Lane	2006	Sinaloa (September 16)	—	—	—	—	
Jova	2011	—	Jalisco (October 12)	—	—	—	
Darby	2016	—	—	—	Big Island, Hawaii (July 24)	—	
John	2024	Guerrero (September 24)	—	—	Michoacán (September 27)	—	
Overall reference for landfall intensity:

== See also ==
- List of Pacific hurricanes
- List of Pacific hurricane seasons
- Pacific hurricanes by intensity:
  - List of Eastern Pacific tropical storms
  - List of Category 1 Pacific hurricanes
  - List of Category 2 Pacific hurricanes
  - List of Category 4 Pacific hurricanes
  - List of Category 5 Pacific hurricanes
