= List of Atlantic–Pacific crossover hurricanes =

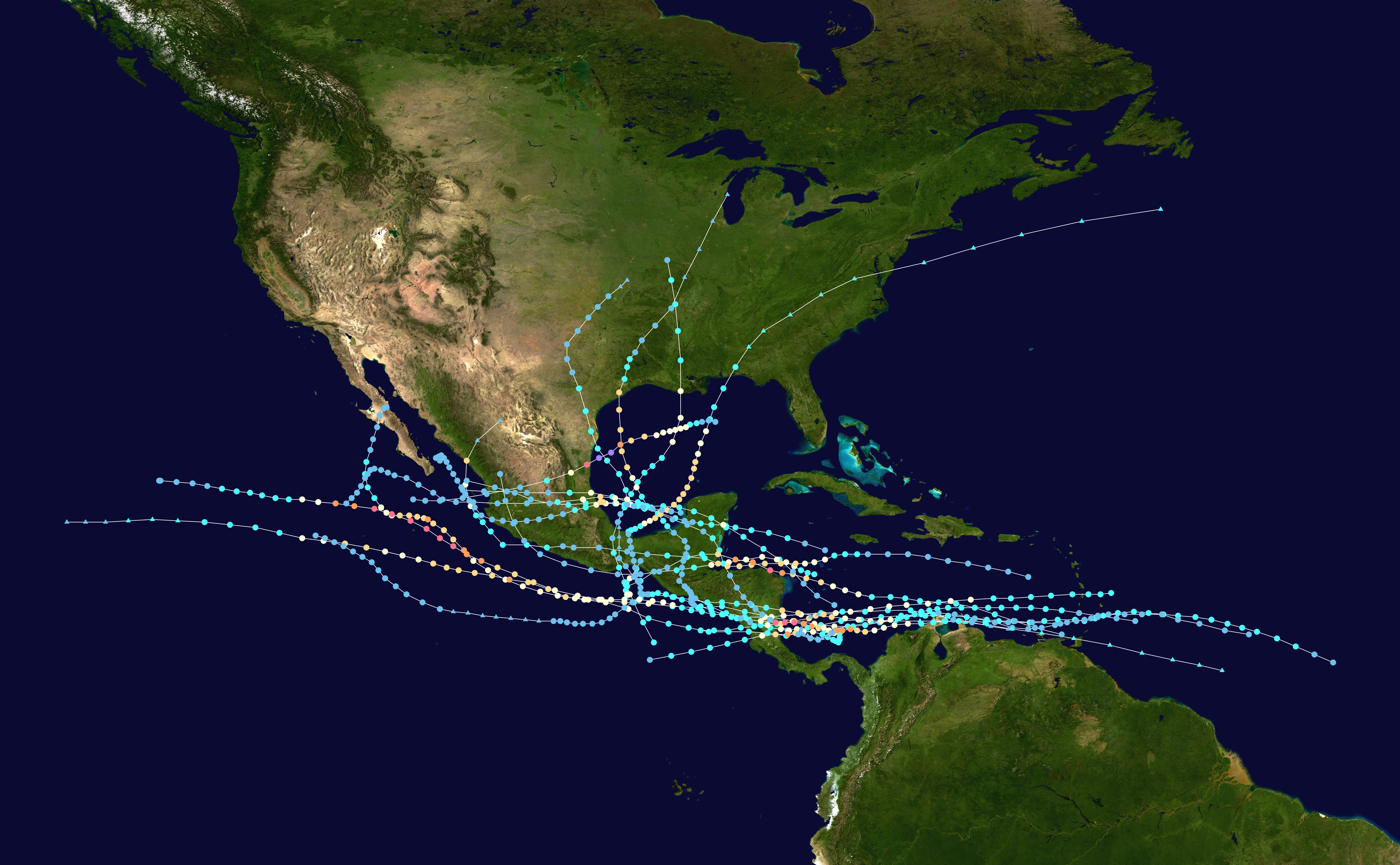
Tracks of storms with a complete crossover

An Atlantic–Pacific crossover hurricane is a tropical cyclone that develops in the Atlantic Ocean and moves into the Pacific Ocean, or vice versa. Since reliable records began in 1851, a total of twenty crossover tropical cyclones have been recorded. As tropical cyclones must travel over land to pass between the Atlantic and Pacific basins, usually their low-level circulation center dissipates and degenerate into remnant lows before completing the crossing. In such instances, they are not considered the same system.

== Storms ==
=== Official crossovers ===
Name	Year	Formation	Dissipation	Peak classification		Minimum Pressure	Maximum Winds	Direction
Name	Year	Formation	Dissipation	Atlantic	Pacific	Minimum Pressure	Maximum Winds	Direction
Unnamed	1842	October	October	Unknown	Unknown	Unknown	Unknown	Pacific→ Atlantic
Unnamed	1876	September 29	October 5	Category 2 hurricane	Tropical storm	Unknown	105 mph (165 km/h)	Atlantic→ Pacific
Unnamed	1902	October 3	October 11	Category 2 hurricane	Tropical depression	970 mbar (28.64 inHg)	105 mph (165 km/h)	Pacific→ Atlantic
Unnamed	1911	September 3	September 12	Category 2 hurricane	Tropical storm	990 mbar (29.23 inHg)	100 mph (155 km/h)	Atlantic→ Pacific
Unnamed	1923	October 12	October 17	Category 1 hurricane	Tropical storm	983 mbar (29.03 inHg)	75 mph (120 km/h)	Pacific→ Atlantic
Unnamed	1945	October 2	October 7	Category 1 hurricane	Tropical depression	982 mbar (29.00 inHg)	85 mph (140 km/h)	Atlantic→ Pacific
Unnamed	1949	September 27	October 5	Category 2 hurricane	Tropical depression	965 mbar (28.50 inHg)	110 mph (175 km/h)	Pacific→ Atlantic
Irene–Olivia	1971	September 11	September 30	Category 1 hurricane	Category 3 hurricane	948 mbar (27.99 inHg)	115 mph (185 km/h)	Atlantic→ Pacific
Anita	1977	August 29	September 4	Category 5 hurricane	Tropical depression	926 mbar (27.34 inHg)	175 mph (280 km/h)	Atlantic→ Pacific
Greta–Olivia	1978	September 13	September 23	Category 4 hurricane	Category 1 hurricane	947 mbar (27.96 inHg)	130 mph (215 km/h)	Atlantic→ Pacific
Debby	1988	August 31	September 8	Category 1 hurricane	Tropical depression	987 mbar (29.15 inHg)	75 mph (120 km/h)	Atlantic→ Pacific
Joan–Miriam	1988	October 10	November 2	Category 4 hurricane	Tropical storm	932 mbar (27.52 inHg)	150 mph (240 km/h)	Atlantic→ Pacific
Diana	1990	August 4	August 9	Category 2 hurricane	Tropical depression	980 mbar (28.94 inHg)	100 mph (155 km/h)	Atlantic→ Pacific
Gert	1993	September 14	September 26	Category 2 hurricane	Tropical depression	970 mbar (28.64 inHg)	105 mph (165 km/h)	Atlantic→ Pacific
Cesar–Douglas	1996	July 24	August 6	Category 1 hurricane	Category 4 hurricane	946 mbar (27.94 inHg)	130 mph (215 km/h)	Atlantic→ Pacific
Dolly	1996	August 19	August 25	Category 1 hurricane	Tropical depression	980 mbar (28.94 inHg)	80 mph (130 km/h)	Atlantic→ Pacific
Hermine	2010	September 3	September 9	Tropical storm	Tropical depression	989 mbar (29.21 inHg)	70 mph (110 km/h)	Pacific→ Atlantic
Otto	2016	November 20	November 26	Category 3 hurricane	Tropical storm	975 mbar (28.79 inHg)	115 mph (185 km/h)	Atlantic→ Pacific
Bonnie	2022	July 1	July 9	Tropical storm	Category 3 hurricane	964 mbar (28.47 inHg)	115 mph (185 km/h)	Atlantic→ Pacific
Julia	2022	October 7	October 10	Category 1 hurricane	Tropical storm	982 mbar (29.00 inHg)	85 mph (140 km/h)	Atlantic→ Pacific
Note: Information is mostly provided by the Atlantic best track.

=== Other storms ===
There have also been numerous tropical cyclones that formed in one basin, dissipated, and re-developed in the other, which are not considered an Atlantic-Pacific crossover hurricane by the NHC. In chronological order from earliest to most recent, they are:

- The remnants of Hurricane Janet in 1955 later led to the formation of an unnamed tropical storm in the East Pacific on October 1; the newly generated tropical cyclone later brought rains to the southwestern United States.
- In 1960, Hurricane Abby made landfall over Belize, then known as British Honduras, and dissipated a day later while situated over the Mexican state of Tabasco. Its remnants crossed over Mexico into the Pacific Ocean and regenerated into Hurricane Celeste on July 20.
- In 1969, Hurricane Francelia hit southern Belize, then known as British Honduras, weakening quickly over land and dissipating over Guatemala. The system continued slowly across Central America, crossing into the eastern Pacific Ocean three days after it moved ashore. Its remnants eventually redeveloped into Tropical Storm Glenda off the coast of Mexico.
- Tropical Storm Chloe in 1971 made landfall in the Yucatán Peninsula and dissipated soon after. Its remnants continued into the Eastern Pacific and developed into Hurricane Lily, which made landfall in southwest Mexico.
- Also in 1971, Tropical Storm Laura made landfall in Belize and dissipated in Guatemala. Its remnants continued into the Eastern Pacific and developed into Tropical Storm Sharon.
- In 1974, Hurricane Fifi quickly weakened after making landfall in Belize, becoming a depression late on September 20 and dissipated a day later. It's remnants became associated with a large-scale circulation that led to the formation of a system on September 22, which would later become Hurricane Orlene.
- In 1978, Tropical Storm Bess went southward, affecting Mexico. Its remnants crossed into the Pacific Ocean, where it regenerated into Hurricane Iva.
- Later in 1978, Hurricane Cora's remnants crossed over Central America into the Pacific Ocean, where it reintensified, becoming Hurricane Kristy.
- In 1988, Tropical Depression Six degenerated into a tropical wave near the island of Jamaica on August 23. A day later it moved over Central America with minimal convection and redeveloped into Hurricane Kristy once it reached the eastern Pacific.
- Later on that same year, Tropical Storm Isaac completely dissipated on October 1 near Windward Islands. Its remnants moved northwestward and crossed into in the eastern Pacific Ocean basin, where it eventually regenerated as Tropical Depression Twenty-E days later.
- Hurricane Cosme in 1989 crossed from the Pacific, and its low-level circulation dissipated over northern Mexico. Its remnants merged with another tropical wave and contributed to the development of Tropical Storm Allison in the Atlantic.
- Later that same year, Tropical Depression Six degenerated into a tropical wave near the Lesser Antilles. Some days later it split into two, with the southern half crossing into the Pacific, where it developed into Hurricane Lorena.
- Later in 1989, Tropical Depression Nine degenerated into a tropical wave in the Atlantic, where it continued travelling westwards, crossing into the Pacific, where it developed into Hurricane Octave.
- Operationally, it was considered that Tropical Storm Bret, from 1993, retained its circulation and was designated Tropical Depression Eight-E upon reaching the Pacific, later becoming Hurricane Greg, but post-storm analysis determined that Bret actually dissipated over western Nicaragua, with Greg forming from its remnants several days later.
- Tropical Depression Nine in 2001 made landfall in Nicaragua and degenerated into a tropical wave. The wave later regenerated into a tropical depression that became Hurricane Juliette.
- The remnants of Hurricane Iris in 2001 triggered the formation of Tropical Storm Manuel in the Eastern Pacific.
- Tropical Storm Earl in 2004 dissipated in the southeast Caribbean Sea, but its remnants regenerated into Hurricane Frank in the East Pacific.
- Tropical Storm Alma of 2008 formed off of the West Coast of Costa Rica, and made landfall in Nicaragua with sustained wind speeds up to 100 kilometres per hour (62 mph). The low-level circulation center of the storm soon dissipated. A day later, the storm's remnants regenerated just off the coast of Belize into Tropical Storm Arthur, after encountering a pair of two tropical waves, with sustained winds of 75 km/h (47 mph), and made landfall in Belize shortly thereafter. It is not considered as crossover storm, as the original low-level circulation center had dissipated, and since the system also merged with another tropical wave prior to regeneration.
- Hurricane Ernesto of 2012 developed near the Lesser Antilles. The system weakened to a low-pressure area in Mexico, and its remnants moved into the eastern Pacific and developed into Tropical Storm Hector.
- Hurricane Barbara of 2013 made landfall in southwest Mexico and dissipated before reaching the Gulf of Mexico. The remnants of Barbara and a cyclonic gyre led to the formation of a broad area of low pressure, which later became Tropical Storm Andrea over the central Gulf of Mexico.
- Tropical Storm Trudy of 2014 formed in the eastern Pacific and made landfall in southern Mexico, its remnants emerged into the Bay of Campeche and subsequently developed into Tropical Storm Hanna in the Atlantic.
- The remnant moisture from Hurricane Earl of 2016 interacted with a disturbance on the Pacific coast of Mexico, which contributed to the formation of Tropical Storm Javier in the eastern Pacific.
- The remnants of Tropical Storm Bret of 2017 traversed over Central America and emerged into the eastern Pacific, which led to the formation of Hurricane Dora.
- Also in 2017, Hurricane Franklin made landfall in the Mexican state of Veracruz; its remnants moved across Mexico during the following day and emerged into the eastern Pacific, later developing into Tropical Storm Jova.
- Later that year, Hurricane Katia made landfall in Mexico and was then downgraded to a remnant low; its remnants crossed into the Pacific Ocean, where it regenerated into Hurricane Otis.
- Tropical Storm Amanda of 2020 made landfall in southeastern Guatemala, rapidly weakened, and the storm's low-level circulation center dissipated. However, its remnant low-pressure area continued northward and eventually regenerated into Tropical Storm Cristobal in the Bay of Campeche.
- Hurricane Nana of 2020 made landfall in Belize, weakened, and the storm's low-level circulation center dissipated over Guatemala. After its mid-level circulation emerged into the Pacific, contrary to expectations, it developed a new surface low and regenerated into Tropical Storm Julio.
- Hurricane Grace in 2021 made landfall in Mexico as a strong Category 3 hurricane, and the system's low-level circulation center soon dissipated. Its mid-level remnants emerged into the Eastern Pacific and redeveloped into Tropical Storm Marty.
- Hurricane Agatha of 2022 made landfall in Oaxaca then degenerated into a remnant low which dissipated inland, near the northern coast of the Isthmus of Tehuantepec. The remnant low was absorbed into the disorganized disturbance complex that eventually became Tropical Storm Alex.
- Hurricane Julia of 2022, itself a crossover system, made landfall in El Salvador and degraded to a remnant low over Guatemala. Its broad low-level circulation partially contributed to the formation of Tropical Storm Karl over the Gulf of Mexico.
- In 2023, the remnants of Tropical Depression Twenty-One crossed over Central America from the Atlantic and contributed to the formation of Tropical Storm Pilar in the Eastern Pacific.
- An unnamed tropical storm dissipated south of Oaxaca in October 2024. Its remnants crossed over into the Gulf of Mexico and merged with the stationary front that eventually became Hurricane Milton in the Atlantic.
- Later that same month, Tropical Storm Nadine made landfall in Belize, and dissipated over southern Mexico. Its remnants crossed into the Pacific basin and were absorbed by a developing trough of low pressure over the Gulf of Tehuantepec, which became Hurricane Kristy.
- Remnant moisture from Tropical Storm Cristina of 2026 merged with a large tropical wave over the Yucatán Peninsula, which contributed to the formation of Tropical Storm Arthur.

== Naming conventions ==
Prior to 2000, storms were renamed after crossing from the Atlantic into the Eastern Pacific. At the 22nd hurricane committee in 2000 it was decided that tropical cyclones that moved from the Atlantic to the Eastern Pacific basin and vice versa would no longer be renamed. Hurricane Otto in 2016 was the first storm to cross from one basin to another to apply under this rule.

== See also ==
- Pacific hurricane season
- Atlantic hurricane season
