= Hurricane Lily (1971) =

Category 1 Pacific hurricane in 1971

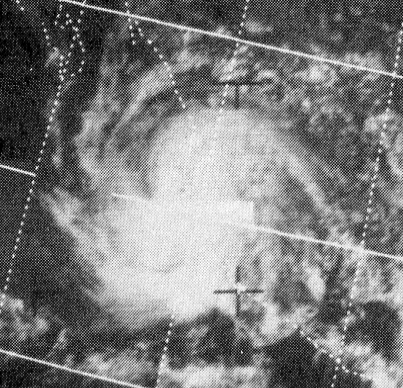
- Hurricane Lily on August 30 around the time it reached hurricane intensity.

Meteorological history
- Formed: August 28, 1971
- Dissipated: August 31, 1971

Category 1 hurricane
- 1-minute sustained (SSHWS/NWS)
- Highest winds: 85 mph (140 km/h)
- Lowest pressure: 980 mbar (hPa); 28.94 inHg

Overall effects
- Fatalities: 12–14 direct
- Damage: Unknown
- Areas affected: Mexico
- IBTrACS
- Part of the 1971 Pacific hurricane season

Hurricane Lily was a short-lived Category 1 hurricane of August 1971 that devastated the city of Puerto Vallarta in Mexico. Forming from an area of cloudiness associated with former Atlantic Tropical Storm Chloe, the storm slowly intensified, building to peak intensity just before landfall northwest of Manzanillo, Colima on August 31. The hurricane quickly weakened and became extratropical. After leaving land, the extratropical remnants of Lily dissipated on September 1. The storm's movement close to land affected shipping due to the limited warning, which was partially set back due to difficulties in clarifying the hurricane's position on radar from reconnaissance aircraft.

The hurricane was Puerto Vallarta's worst in two decades and the second hurricane of the season to heavily impact Mexico after Hurricane Bridget. The storm caused the Cuale River to overflow its banks, inundating the downtown section of Puerto Vallarta with water that was up to 8 feet (2.4 m) deep in some sections. The Mexican army flew in aid after trucks were blocked by flooded roads. The hurricane claimed three lives on the mainland and nine lives when a boat capsized.

== Meteorological history ==
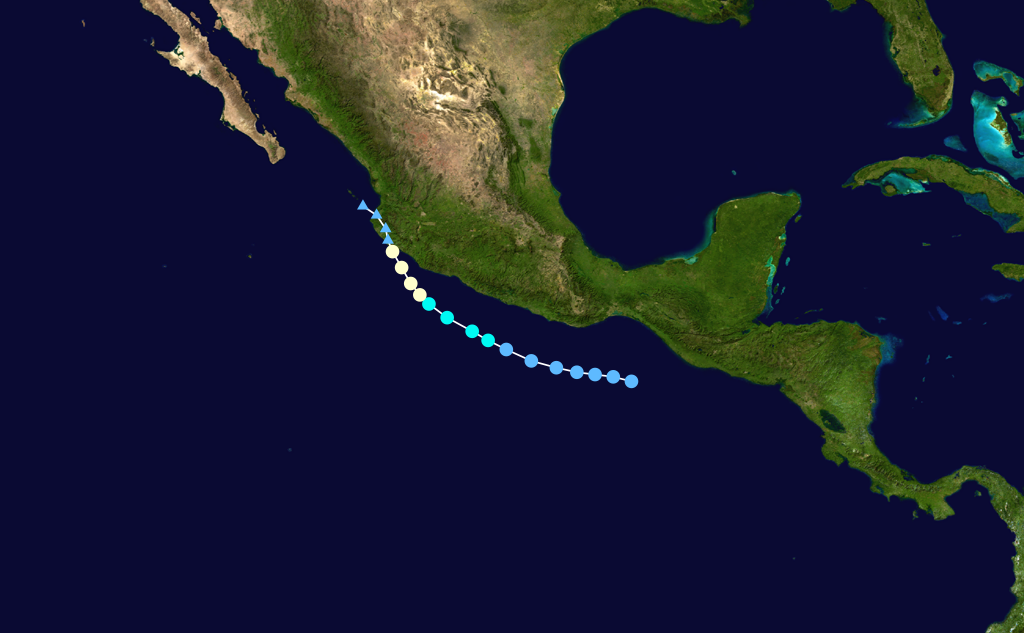
Map plotting the storm's track and intensity, according to the Saffir–Simpson scale Map key Saffir–Simpson scale Tropical depression (≤38 mph, ≤62 km/h) Tropical storm (39–73 mph, 63–118 km/h) Category 1 (74–95 mph, 119–153 km/h) Category 2 (96–110 mph, 154–177 km/h) Category 3 (111–129 mph, 178–208 km/h) Category 4 (130–156 mph, 209–251 km/h) Category 5 (≥157 mph, ≥252 km/h) Unknown Storm type Tropical cyclone Subtropical cyclone Extratropical cyclone, remnant low, tropical disturbance, or monsoon depression

On August 25, Tropical Storm Chloe made landfall on British Honduras (present day Belize) as a tropical depression. After dissipating, the remnants of the storm crossed into the Pacific Ocean, where they contributed to an area of shower activity that persisted over the Gulf of Tehuantepec. On August 28, the tropical activity organized around a circulation which quickly developed into a tropical depression the same day. The depression was upgraded to a tropical storm on August 29 based on satellite presentation that depicted significant cirrus outflow and a comma–shaped cloud mass spanning 2° of latitude in diameter and was subsequently named Lily.

Following its upgrade to tropical storm intensity, Lily began developing a spiral cloud structure and heavy anticyclonic outflow on August 30 and was upgraded to a hurricane the same day. During its intensification, United States Air Force reconnaissance tried to fly into the hurricane, but penetration was rendered impossible due to the cumulonimbus clouds in the spiral bands, causing the aircraft to rely on radar readings, which showed an eye 40 miles (64 km) in diameter. Following the flight, the hurricane turned to the north-northwestward towards the Mexican coast. On August 31, a ship called the Turrialba reported a 980-millibar (29 inHg) sea–level pressure while in the eye of the hurricane. Shortly after the report, the hurricane peaked in intensity with winds of 85 mph (137 km/h) just prior to landfall 30 miles (48 km) northwest of Manzanillo. The cyclone quickly weakened overland, and after only six hours over land, its winds weakened to only 30 mph (48 km/h), a decline of 55 mph (89 km/h) and the cyclone became extratropical. The now–extratropical Lily continued to cross the Mexican coast, and shortly after emerging over water on September 1, the cyclone dissipated.

== Impact ==
The north-northwestward track Lily took off the Mexican coast was not well-forecast due in part to difficulties in interpreting the radar data from the reconnaissance flight. As a result, many ships got caught in hurricane-force winds and high seas while trying to cross between it and the coastline. The Turrialba also reported that many exhausted tropical birds were taken aboard the ship while in the eye. The ship had to maneuver in order to avoid hitting other ships in the area. Another boat with twelve people aboard capsized off a beach near Puerto Vallarta while weathering wind gusts of 110 mph (180 km/h) from the hurricane. Nine aboard the ship were reported dead as a result, but four others were able to swim back to shore.

The hurricane was the worst to strike Puerto Vallarta in 20 years. 5,000 people were evacuated due to the hurricane with an additional 500 people on vacation becoming stranded inside their hotels. At least 600 evacuees sought refuge in a customs house, with an additional 1000 more evacuating to an airport terminal. More evacuees sought shelter in schools and the city hall. Four major rivers, including the Cuale River, which flows into the city, overflowed their banks, inundating the city along with several neighboring communities. Some areas of downtown Puerto Vallarta were submerged in depths of up to 8 feet (2.4 m) due to the flooding. Telephone lines in the city were suspended and highways were rendered impassable by the floods. One person died during a house collapse in the city and two others drowned. Another source reported five deaths from house collapses, although the post-season report regards only three deaths in association with Lily in Mexico. The hurricane also passed over the nearby town of Barra de Navidad, where the residents took refuge inside the church of San Antonio. A local legend states that during the hurricane, the arms of Jesus Christ on the church's crucifix broke and hung down. The moment the arms broke, the hurricane's effects in the town stopped. The figure has since been known as the Christ of the Cyclone.

=== Aftermath ===
Relief efforts following the hurricane were mostly affected by the associated flooding. Trucks transporting food and medicine from the Jalisco state government were forced to turn back because of flooded roads. The army then decided on an aerial transport. This effort was hampered because, after three federal helicopters and Air Force planes touched down at the local airport, the road into the city was still flooded, meaning the aid could not be distributed.

Lily's effects in Puerto Vallarta made it the second hurricane of the season to be declared the worst hurricane to strike a specific city in twenty or more years. The first was Hurricane Bridget, which struck Acapulco. Despite the damage, the name was not retired and was reused in 1975, but due to a change in names lists in 1978, the name Lily has not been used since.

== See also ==
- List of Pacific hurricanes
- Other tropical cyclones named Lily
- Hurricane Beatriz
