= 1971 Pacific hurricane season =

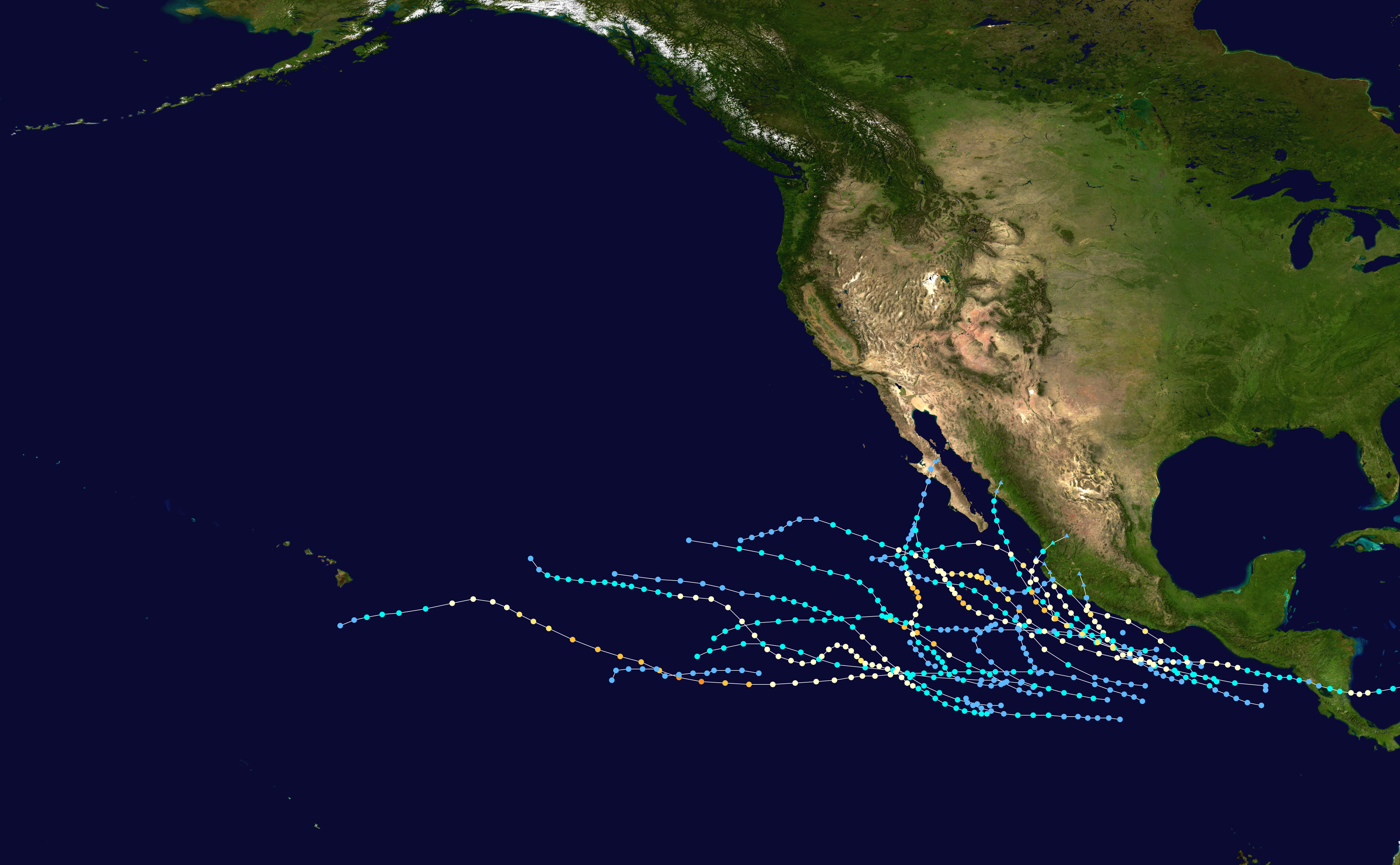
- Season summary map

Seasonal boundaries
- First system formed: May 21, 1971
- Last system dissipated: November 29, 1971

Strongest storm
- By maximum sustained winds: Denise
  - Maximum winds: 140 mph (220 km/h) (1-minute sustained)
  - Lowest pressure: 951 mbar (hPa; 28.08 inHg)
- By central pressure: Olivia
  - Maximum winds: 115 mph (185 km/h) (1-minute sustained)
  - Lowest pressure: 948 mbar (hPa; 27.99 inHg)

Seasonal statistics
- Total depressions: 22
- Total storms: 18
- Hurricanes: 12
- Major hurricanes (Cat. 3+): 6
- Total fatalities: 31 total
- Total damage: $40 million (1971 USD)

Related articles
- 1971 Atlantic hurricane season; 1971 Pacific typhoon season; 1971 North Indian Ocean cyclone season

The 1971 Pacific hurricane season was the first Pacific hurricane season with reliable records. It began on May 15, 1971 in the eastern Pacific (east of 140°W), and on June 1, 1971 in the Central Pacific (from 140°W to the International Date Line); both ended on November 30, 1971. These dates, adopted by convention, historically describe the period in each year when most tropical cyclogenesis occurs in these regions of the Pacific. It was the first year that continuous Weather satellite coverage existed over the entire Central Pacific. As such, this season is often viewed as the start year for modern reliable tropical cyclone data in the Pacific Ocean.

It was an above average Pacific hurricane season with 22 tropical cyclones forming, of which 18 became named storms. During the season, 12 storms became hurricanes, of which 6 became major hurricanes by reaching Category 3 or higher on the Saffir-Simpson Hurricane Scale. At the time, this was a single-season record number of storms. This season also had a record 6 systems make landfall: Agatha, Bridget, Katrina, Lily, Olivia and Priscilla.

== Systems ==
=== Hurricane Agatha ===
- Category 2 hurricane (SSHWS)
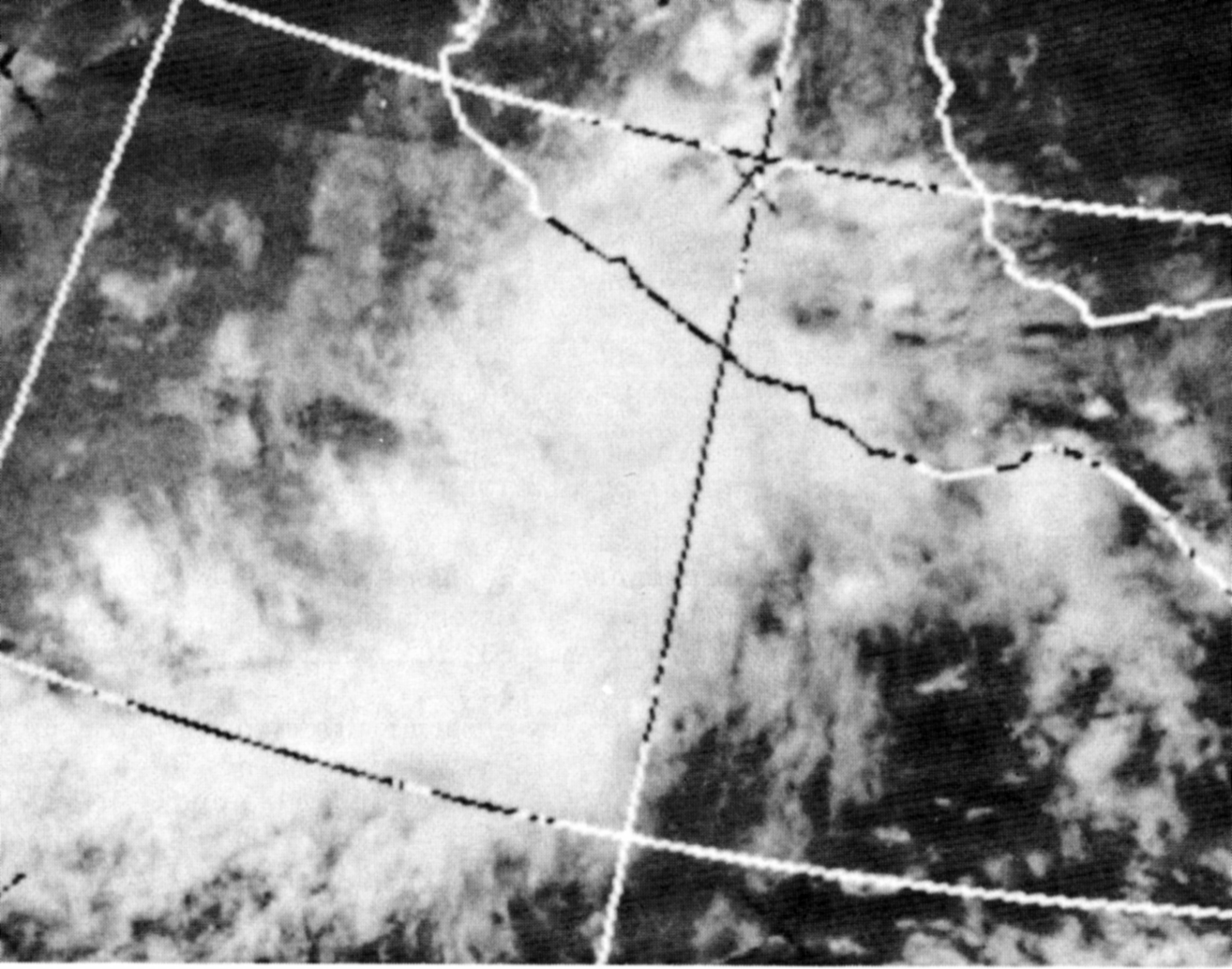
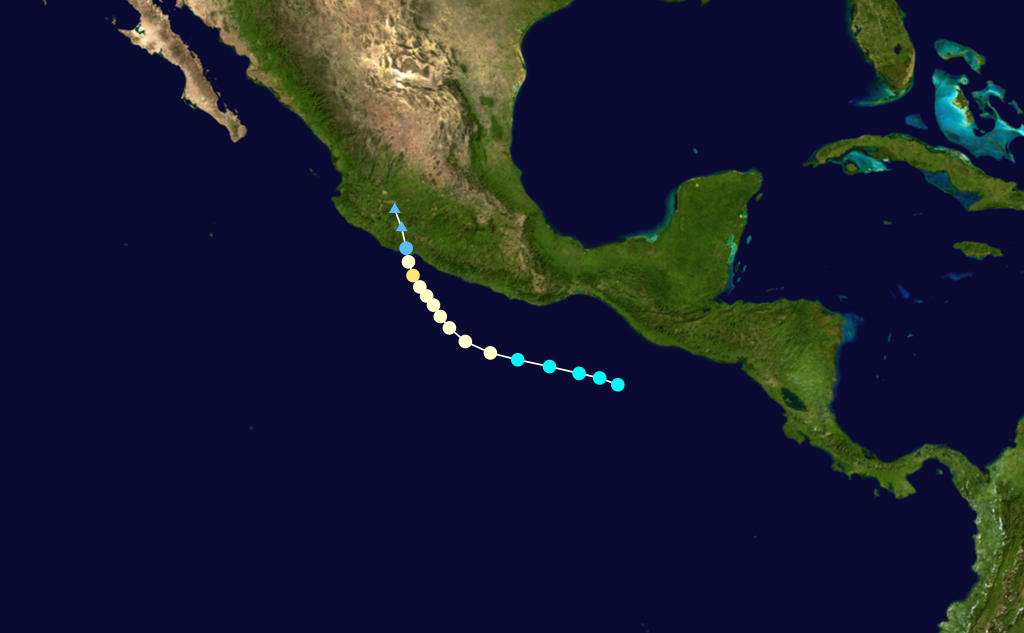
- Duration: May 21 – May 25
- Peak intensity: 100 mph (155 km/h) (1-min); ≤972 mbar (hPa)

On May 21, an area of low pressure developed in the very warm waters south of Tehuantepec, Mexico. Later that day, satellite images showed increasing circulation and Tropical Storm Agatha developed shortly after. Agatha continued moving to the west-northwest parallel to the Mexican coastline and strengthened into a hurricane on May 22. A U.S. Air Force weather reconnaissance aircraft flew into Agatha and found an eye and strong bands. The next day, a reconnaissance plane found winds of 85 to 90 mph (137 to 145 km/h). On May 24, a ship reported winds of 100 mph (160 km/h). Agatha made landfall as a Category 2 hurricane on the Saffir-Simpson hurricane scale within 45 mi (72 km) of Zihuatanejo, Mexico.

The village of Playa Azul was hard hit by the storm. Up to half of the village's homes were destroyed, and much of the banana, mango, and coconut crops were destroyed.

=== Hurricane Bridget ===
- Category 2 hurricane (SSHWS)
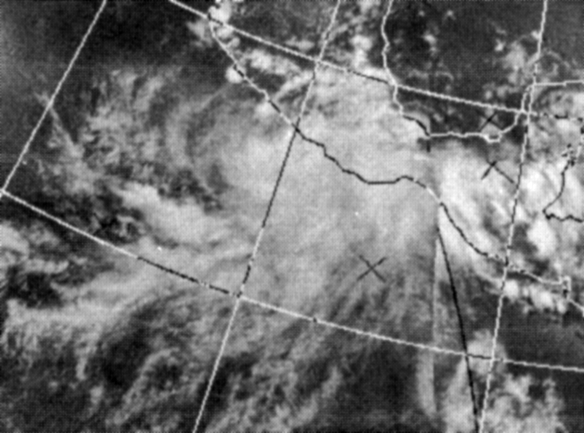
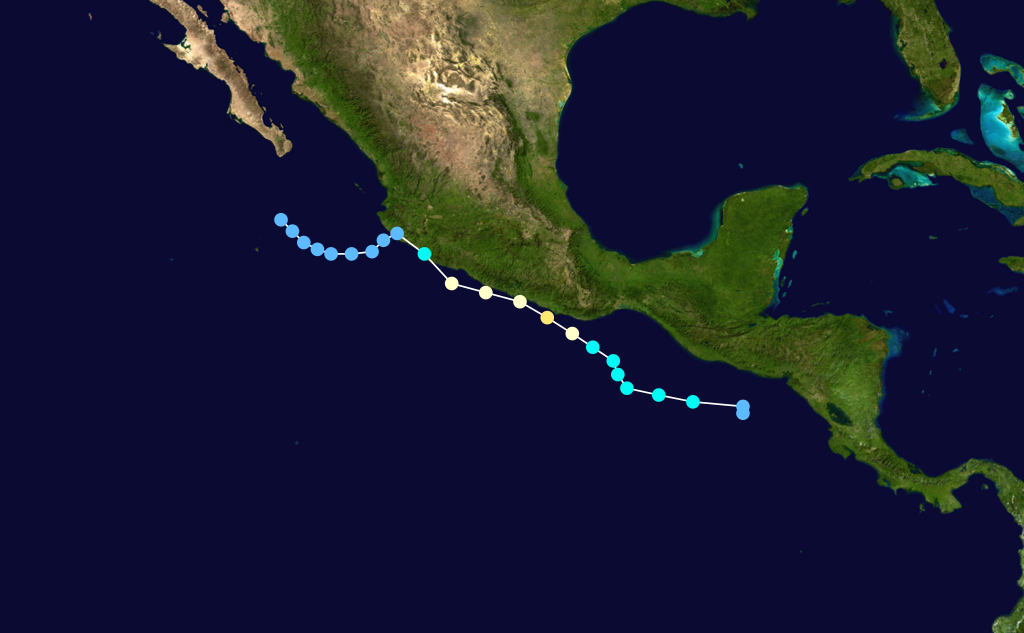
- Duration: June 14 – June 20
- Peak intensity: 100 mph (155 km/h) (1-min); 998 mbar (hPa)

The origins of Bridget were from a tropical wave that exited the coast of Africa on June 3. Around four days later the system entered the Caribbean Sea, passing over the San Andres islands on June 12. The area of convection, or thunderstorms, spread across Central America. A surface circulation developed offshore El Salvador, and the system formed into a tropical depression on June 14. Warm waters allowed for steady intensification as it tracked through the Gulf of Tehuantepec. Early on June 15, a ship reported winds of 40 mph (65 km/h) and 13 ft (4.0 m) seas, which prompted the Eastern Pacific Hurricane Center (EPHC) to upgrade the depression to Tropical Storm Bridget. The storm maintained a general northwest track toward the southwest Mexican coastline. It gradually intensified, and satellite images late on June 16 indicated that Bridget attained hurricane status about 55 mi (95 km) southwest of Puerto Ángel, Oaxaca. It quickly intensified as it neared the coast, reaching winds of 100 mph (155 km/h) just southwest of the Acapulco coastline before weakening. Bridget paralleled the Mexican coastline just offshore before making landfall at 1200 UTC on June 17, about 100 mi (160 km) southeast of Manzanillo, Colima. The hurricane rapidly weakened over the mountainous terrain, emerging into the Pacific Ocean as a tropical depression after being over land for only a few hours. Bridget turned westward as a weak tropical cyclone, eventually dissipating on June 20 to the south of the Baja California peninsula.

While passing to the southwest of Acapulco, Bridget produced heavy rainfall and strong wind gusts reaching 104 mph (167 km/h). The winds damaged or destroyed many roofs across Acapulco, signs, and windows. Strong winds also downed trees and power lines, which left most of Acapulco without electricity. Along the coast, the hurricane produced high tides and waves which flooded low-lying coastal areas with around 1.5 ft (0.46 m) of water. The high tides damaged coastal properties and destroyed 21 boats, including the flagship of the Admiral of the Mexican Navy. Debris-clogged drains caused drainage facilities to exceed their capacities following the heavy rainfall. Overall, the storm killed 17 people in the region, and caused five additional injuries. Damage in the area around Acapulco was estimated at 500 million pesos ($40 million USD). This made it the worst hurricane to hit the city in at least 25 years.

=== Hurricane Carlotta ===
- Category 1 hurricane (SSHWS)
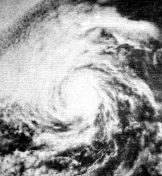
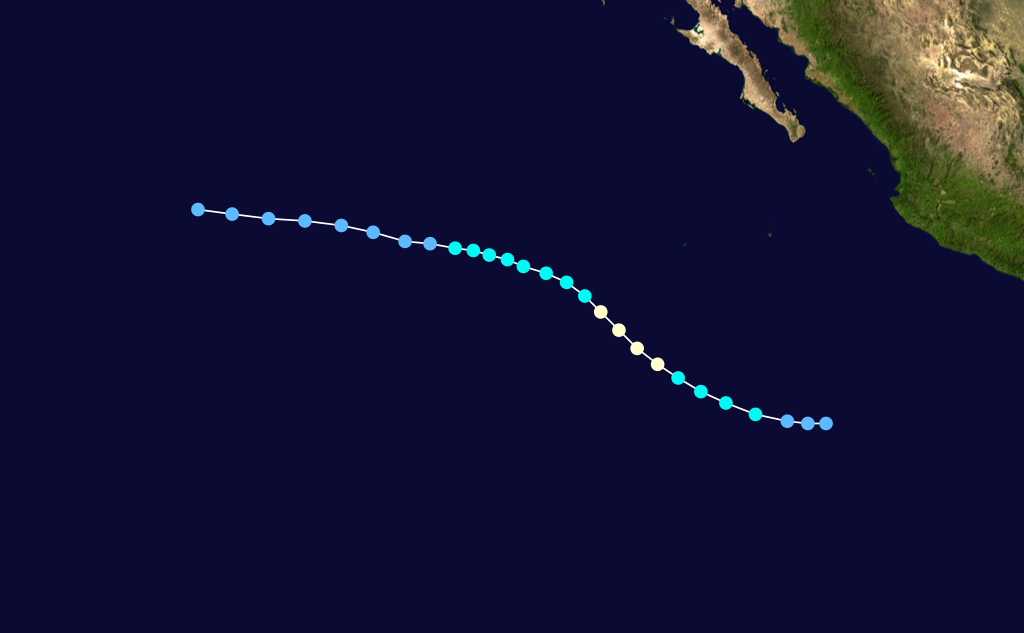
- Duration: July 2 – July 8
- Peak intensity: 85 mph (140 km/h) (1-min); ≤980 mbar (hPa)

On July 1 an area of weather developed about 115 mi (185 km) east of Clipperton Island. On July 2 the area of thunderstorms strengthened into Tropical Storm Carlotta. An Air Force reconnaissance aircraft flew into Carlotta on July 4 and found a system with a well-defined eye and good outflow, but winds only supported a tropical storm. Another reconnaissance plane found winds that were near hurricane strength on July 4. In post-season analysis, it was discovered that Carlotta was a hurricane for 24 hours on July 3 and 4. Later that day, Carlotta started weakening after moving into a less favorable environment. The storm continued to weaken until dissipating on July 8.

Carlotta stayed over open waters during its entire life and no land was affected.

=== Hurricane Denise ===
- Category 4 hurricane (SSHWS)
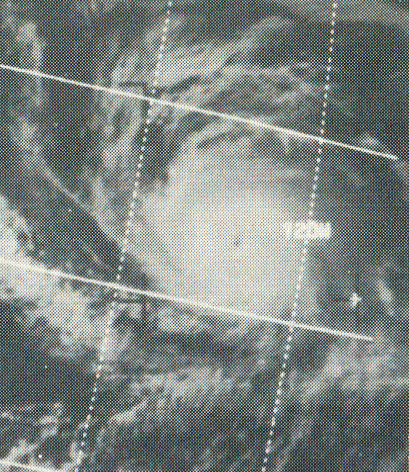
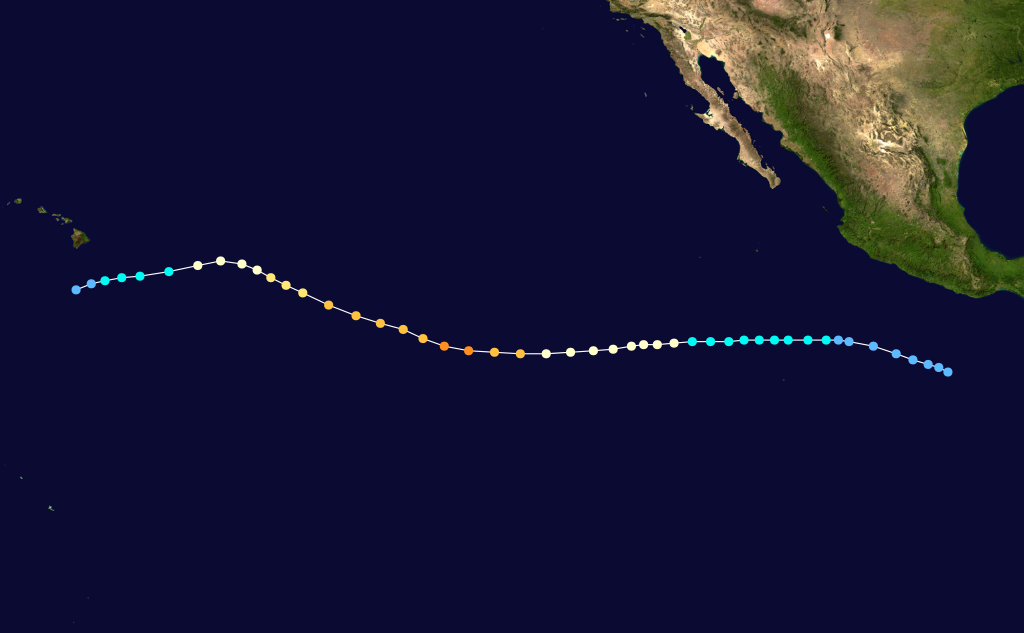
- Duration: July 2 – July 14
- Peak intensity: 140 mph (220 km/h) (1-min); ≤951 mbar (hPa)

On July 2 an area of weather got better organized about 865 mi (1,392 km) east of then Tropical Storm Carlotta. On July 4 satellite imagery indicated that the system had strengthened into Tropical Storm Denise and later into Hurricane Denise on July 6. The system continued to move west and on July 7, U.S. Air Force weather reconnaissance plane found a more organized system with sustained winds estimated to be 90 mph (140 km/h) with a minimum central pressure of 963 mbar (hPa; 28.4 inHg). By July 8, the system had sustained one-minute winds of 125 mph (201 km/h) and a minimum central pressure of 951 mbar (951 hPa; 28.1 inHg). Denise reached a peak intensity of 140 mph (230 km/h), a Category 4 on the Saffir-Simpson Hurricane Scale early on July 9, but then started to weaken.

Denise had started a northwest movement towards Hawaii. A reconnaissance aircraft found surface winds of approximately 115 mph (185 mph) on July 9. Soon after, the eyewall started to dissipate, most likely because of cooler inflow. Over the next 48 hours, the system continued to weaken into a tropical storm. On July 13 the system was approaching the Hawaiian Islands, but a reconnaissance flight only found winds that were barely tropical storm strength. What was left of the storm quickly weakened and Denise became a remnant low.

The remnants of Denise moved south of the Hawaiian Islands, but still brought beneficial rains that caused some minor flooding.

=== Tropical Storm Eleanor ===
- Tropical storm (SSHWS)
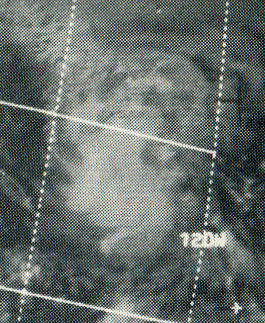
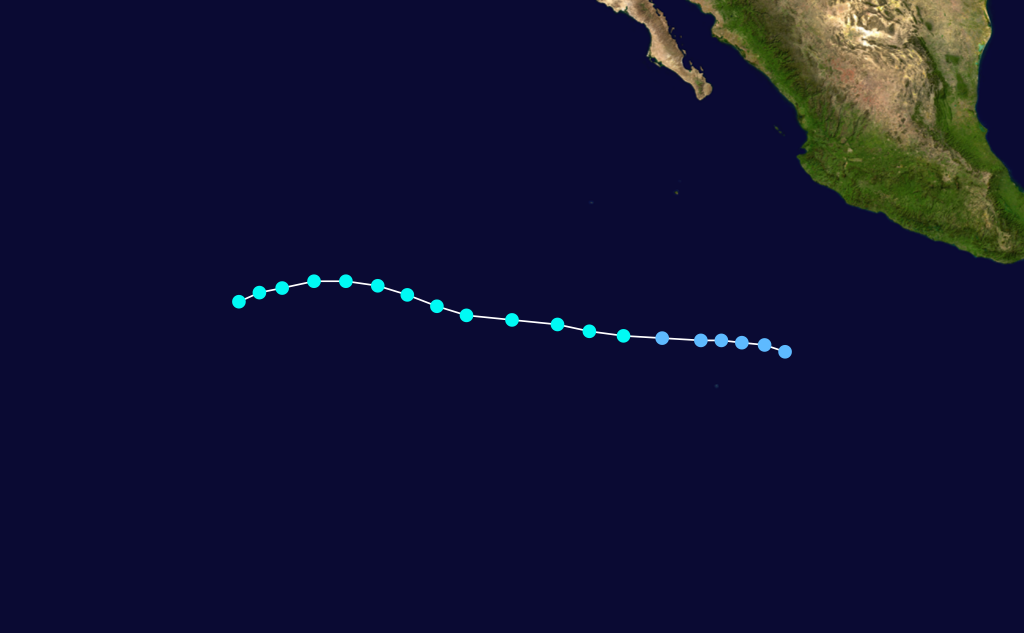
- Duration: July 7 – July 11
- Peak intensity: 60 mph (95 km/h) (1-min); ≤1007 mbar (hPa)

Eleanor was a short-lived, weak tropical storm that stayed well out to sea. On July 7, a tropical depression formed east-southeast of the weakening Carlotta and west of the strengthening Denise. By July 8, satellite imagery showed that the depression had strengthened into a tropical storm. Eleanor strengthened over the next 24 hours to a top strength of 60 mph (97 km/h). On July 10, a U.S. Air Force weather reconnaissance plane found a weakening system and the next day the storm was a dissipating depression moving toward the west-southwest.

=== Hurricane Francene ===
- Category 3 hurricane (SSHWS)
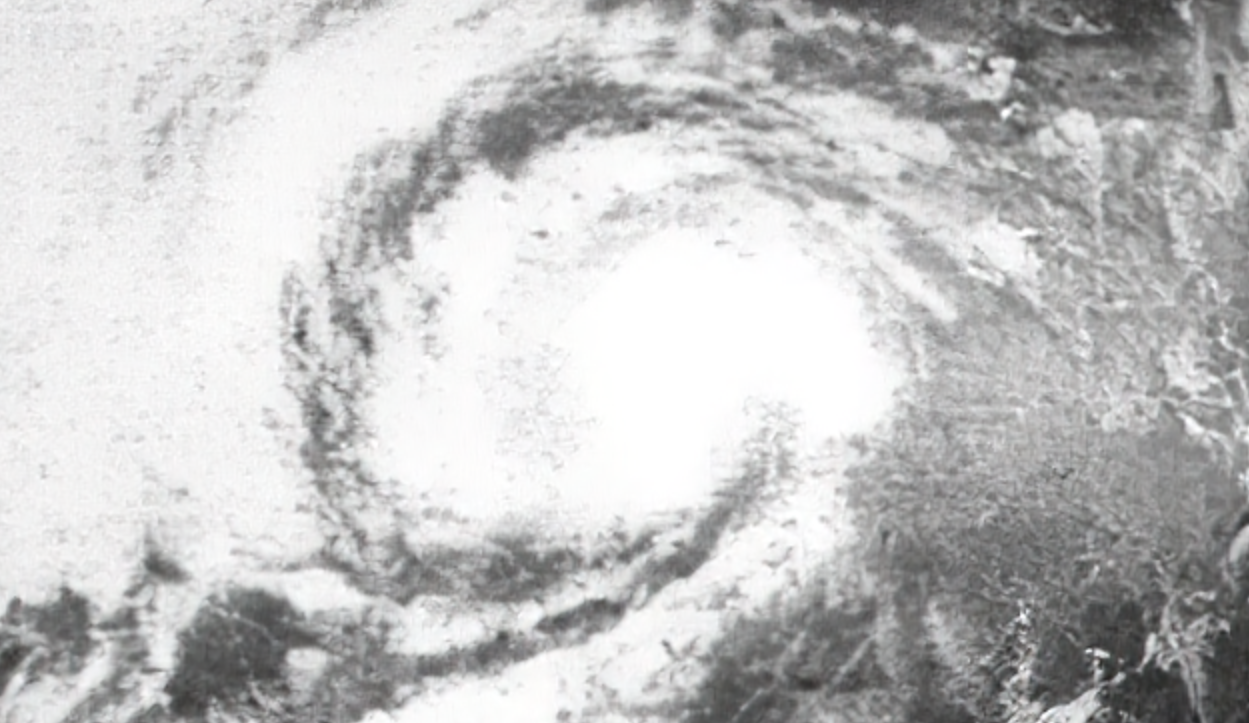
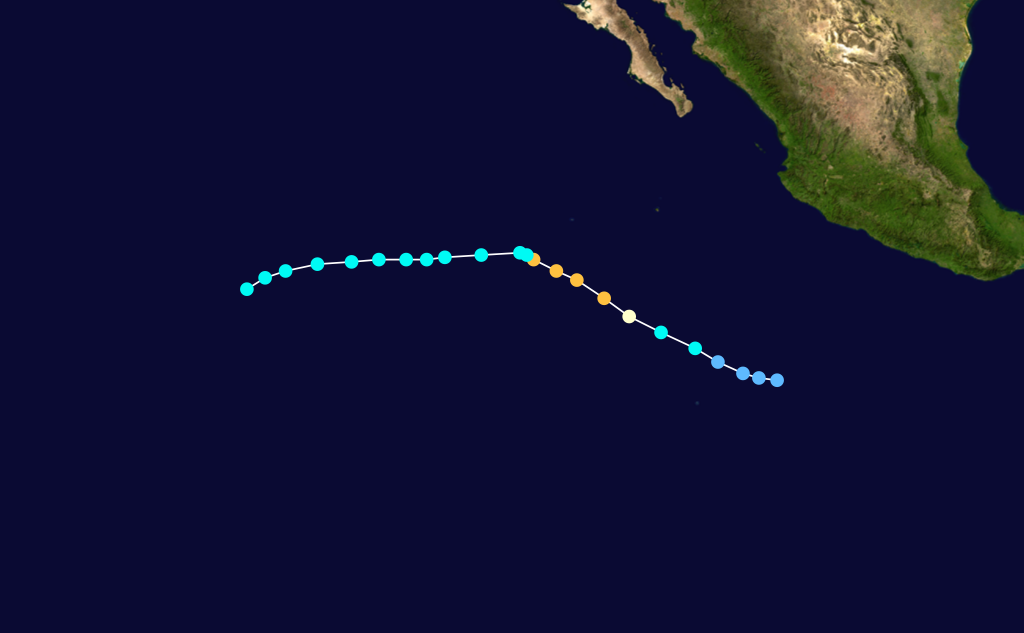
- Duration: July 18 – July 23
- Peak intensity: 115 mph (185 km/h) (1-min); ≤991 mbar (hPa)

An area of enhanced shower activity and low pressure circulation developed a couple hundred miles off the coast of Mexico. On July 18 a tropical depression had formed and on July 19 the system strengthened into Tropical Storm Francene. Francene underwent rapid deepening into a Category 3 hurricane on the Saffir-Simpson Hurricane Scale. However, because of Francene's increasing size, the storm starting pulling in cool surface air which caused weakening. By July 20, Francene had weakened into a tropical storm. Francene continued to weaken over the next 24 hours and was barely a tropical storm by the morning of July 22. That afternoon, Francene began to strengthen once again but it was short-lived. By July 23, the surface circulation had disappeared and Francene was no longer a tropical cyclone. Francene stayed over open water and did not affect land.

=== Tropical Storm Georgette ===
- Tropical storm (SSHWS)
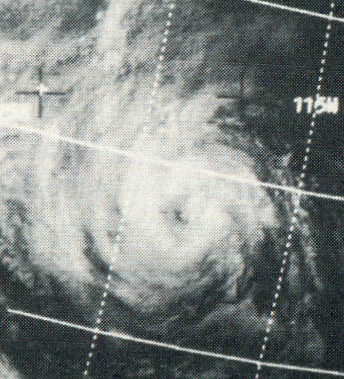
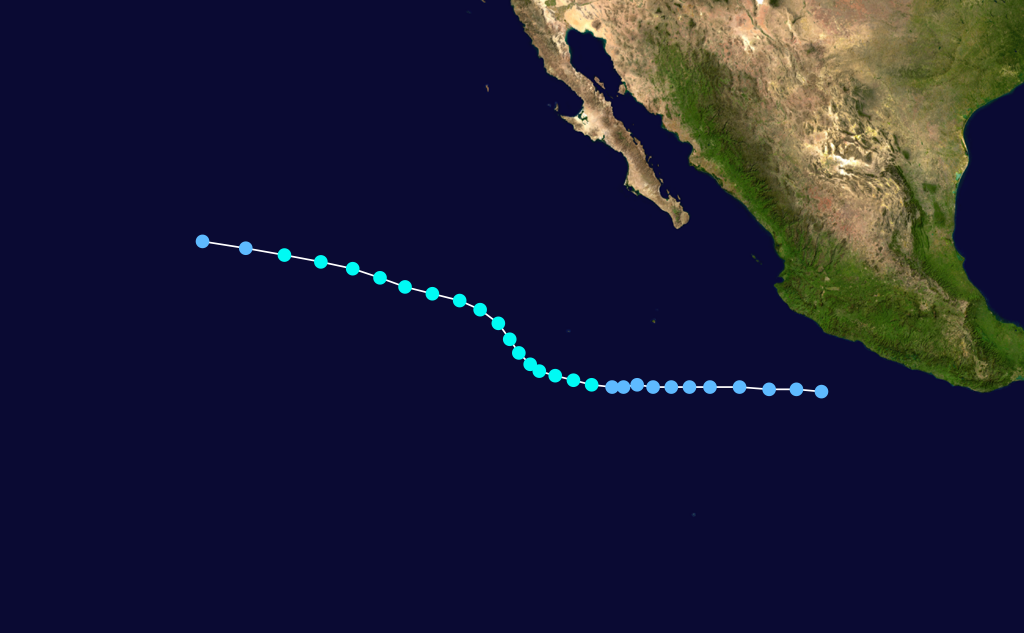
- Duration: July 20 – July 27
- Peak intensity: 60 mph (95 km/h) (1-min); 990 mbar (hPa)

A tropical depression formed to the east of Hurricane Francene on July 20. A reconnaissance flight found a poorly organized tropical storm with winds of 50 mph (80 km/h) on July 23. Georgette reached a peak intensity of 60 mph (97 km/h) the next day. Ships to the north of Georgette reported weak tropical storm force winds. By July 26 the storm began to weaken rapidly before dissipating the next day.

=== Hurricane Hilary ===
- Category 2 hurricane (SSHWS)
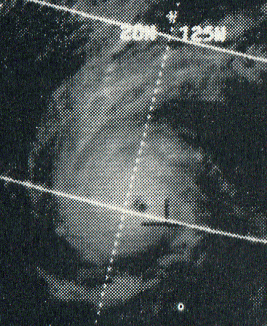
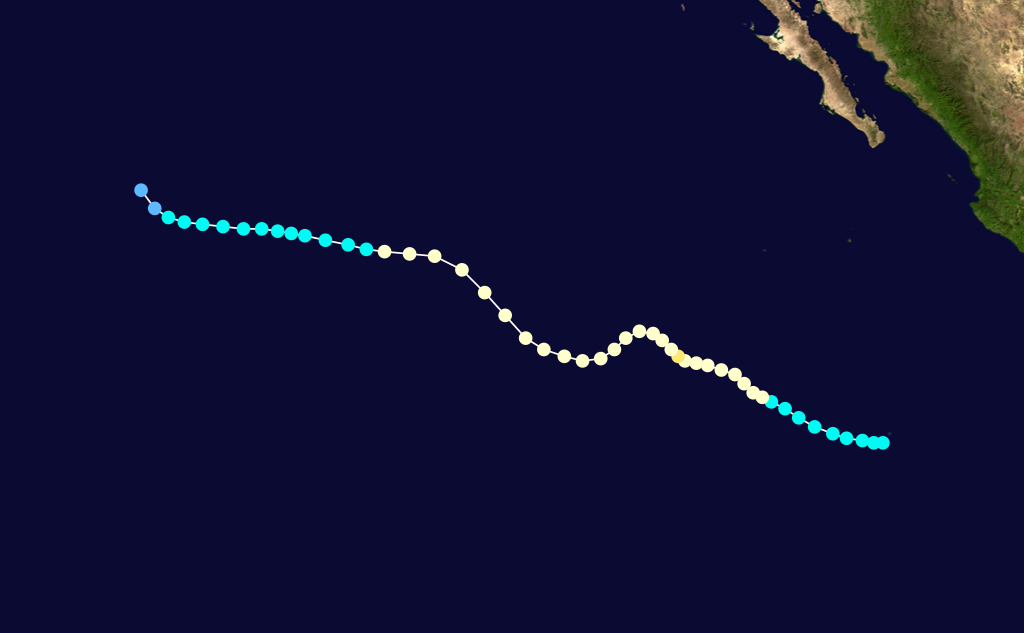
- Duration: July 26 – August 7
- Peak intensity: 100 mph (155 km/h) (1-min); ≤964 mbar (hPa)

Tropical Storm Hilary developed about 115 mi (185 km) west of Clipperton Island on July 26. Hilary strengthened quickly into a hurricane by July 28 and a recon plane found surface winds of 90 mph (140 km/h) and noted a well-defined eye. The hurricane would peak as a category 2 with sustained winds of 100 mph (160 km/h) on July 30. Hilary weakened slightly as its motion became erratic across the tropical Pacific Ocean. By August 1 the hurricane turned to the northwest towards cooler waters. Hilary weakened into a tropical storm on August 3 after being at hurricane strength for a week. Steady weakening continued over the next four days before dissipating in the Central Pacific.

=== Hurricane Ilsa ===
- Category 3 hurricane (SSHWS)
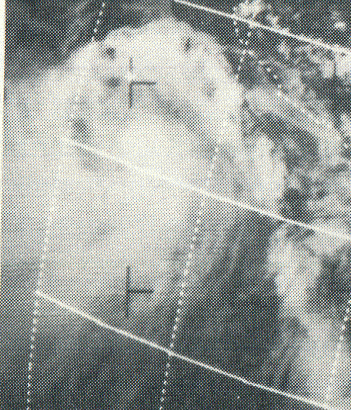
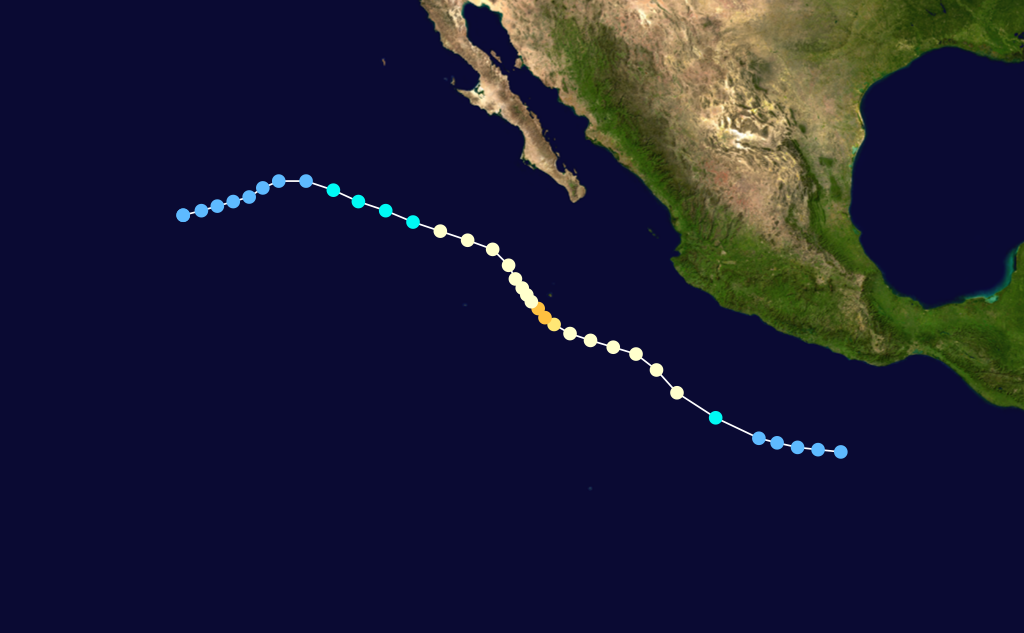
- Duration: July 31 – August 8
- Peak intensity: 115 mph (185 km/h) (1-min); ≤978 mbar (hPa)

Hurricane Ilsa formed on July 31 to the south of the Mexican coast. It gradually strengthened into a tropical storm and a hurricane. Ilsa peaked as a Category 3 hurricane before heading further out to sea and weakening. Hurricane Ilsa dissipated on August 8.

=== Tropical Storm Jewel ===
- Tropical storm (SSHWS)
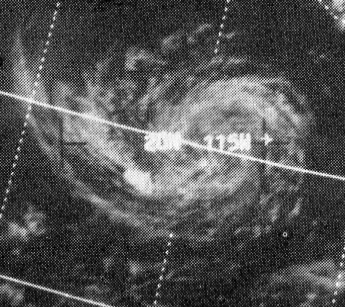
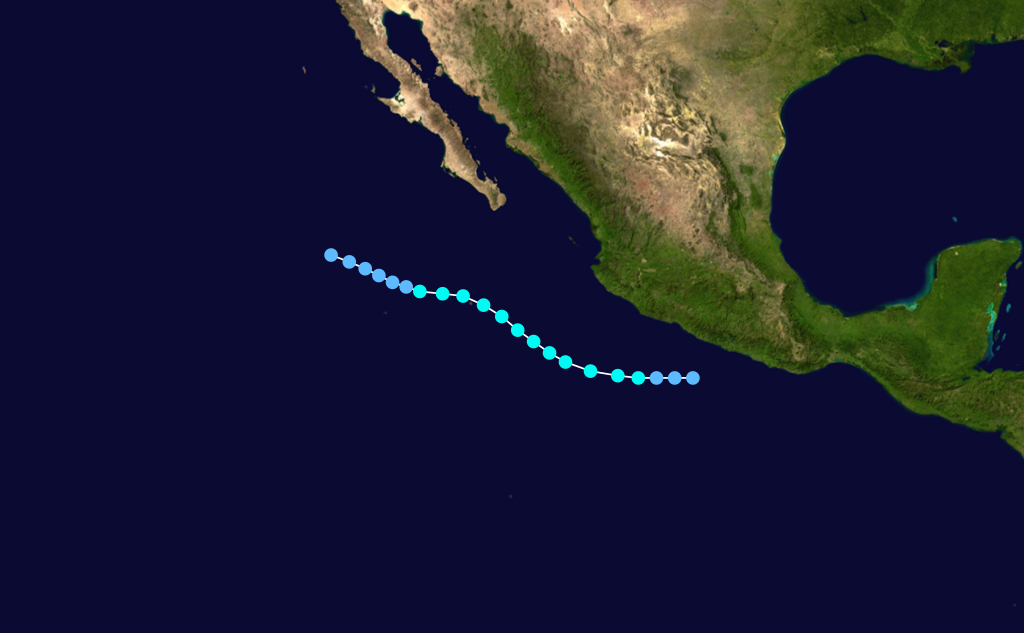
- Duration: August 6 – August 11
- Peak intensity: 70 mph (110 km/h) (1-min); 993 mbar (hPa)

Tropical Storm Jewel formed near Mexico on August 6. Heading out to sea, it strengthened into a 70 mph (110 km/h) tropical storm. It dissipated on August 11.

=== Tropical Storm Katrina ===
- Tropical storm (SSHWS)
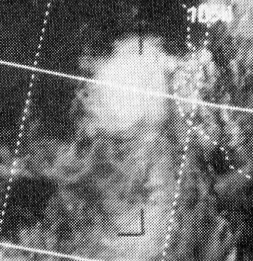
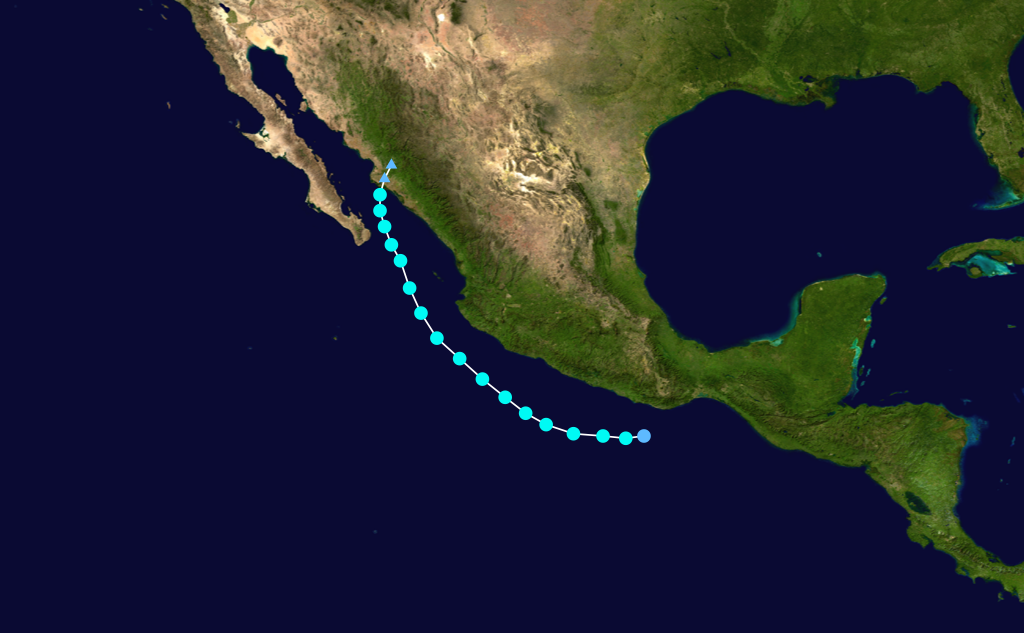
- Duration: August 8 – August 13
- Peak intensity: 65 mph (100 km/h) (1-min); 1008 mbar (hPa)

Katrina was a very small storm. Katrina brushed Baja California Sur and made landfall in the Mexican state of Sonora as a tropical storm. It dissipated on August 13. Rain from Katrina's remnants ruined crops, destroyed railroad trestles, and washed away three bridges.

=== Hurricane Lily ===
- Category 1 hurricane (SSHWS)
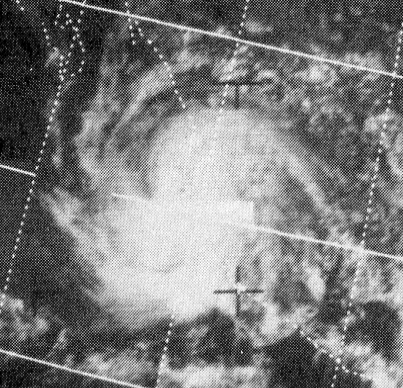
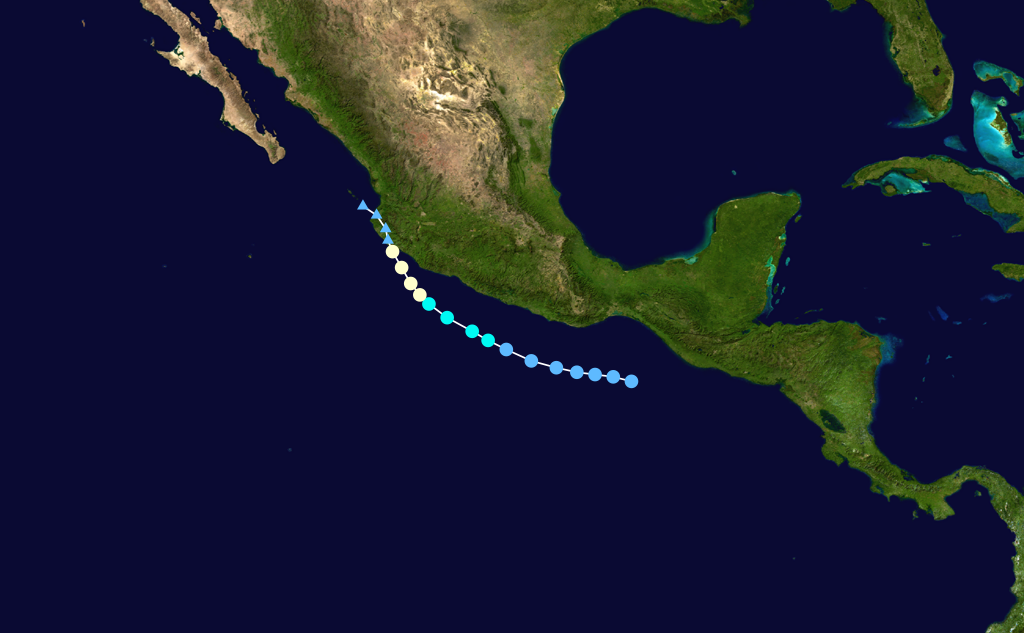
- Duration: August 28 – September 1
- Peak intensity: 85 mph (140 km/h) (1-min); 978 mbar (hPa)

The remnants of Tropical Storm Chloe in the Atlantic formed into Tropical Depression Twelve on August 28. Twelve continued northeast and intensified into a tropical storm and was thus assigned the name Lily. Lily turned northwest. Rapid intensification occurred and Lily developed an eye. Lily peaked with one-minute sustained winds of 85 mph and a pressure of 978mb. Lily made landfall soon after. Once over land, Lily fell below tropical storm intensity. Then the hurricane turned northwest and dissipated soon after.

=== Hurricane Monica ===
- Category 3 hurricane (SSHWS)
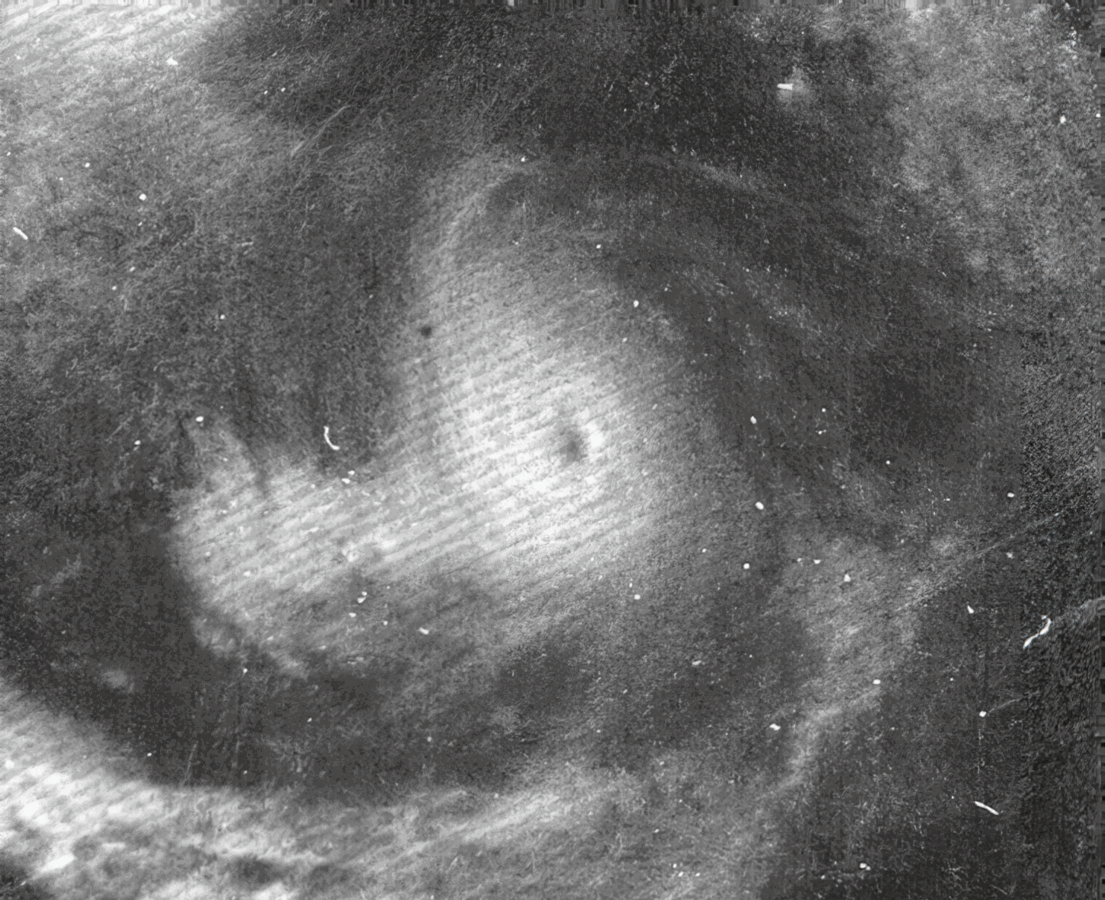
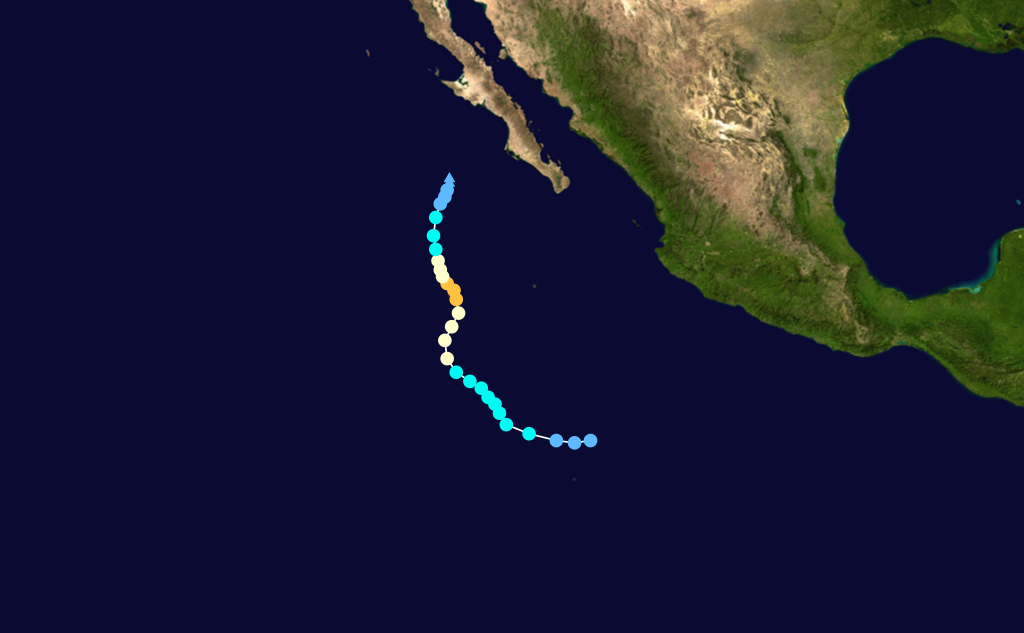
- Duration: August 29 – September 5
- Peak intensity: 115 mph (185 km/h) (1-min); ≤1005 mbar (hPa)

Monica was a Category 3 hurricane which did not affect land.

=== Hurricane Nanette ===
- Category 2 hurricane (SSHWS)
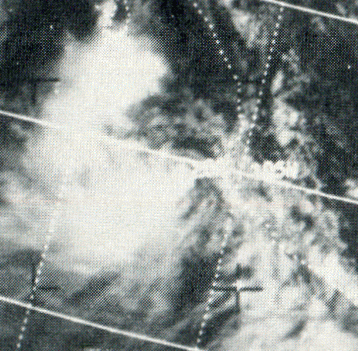
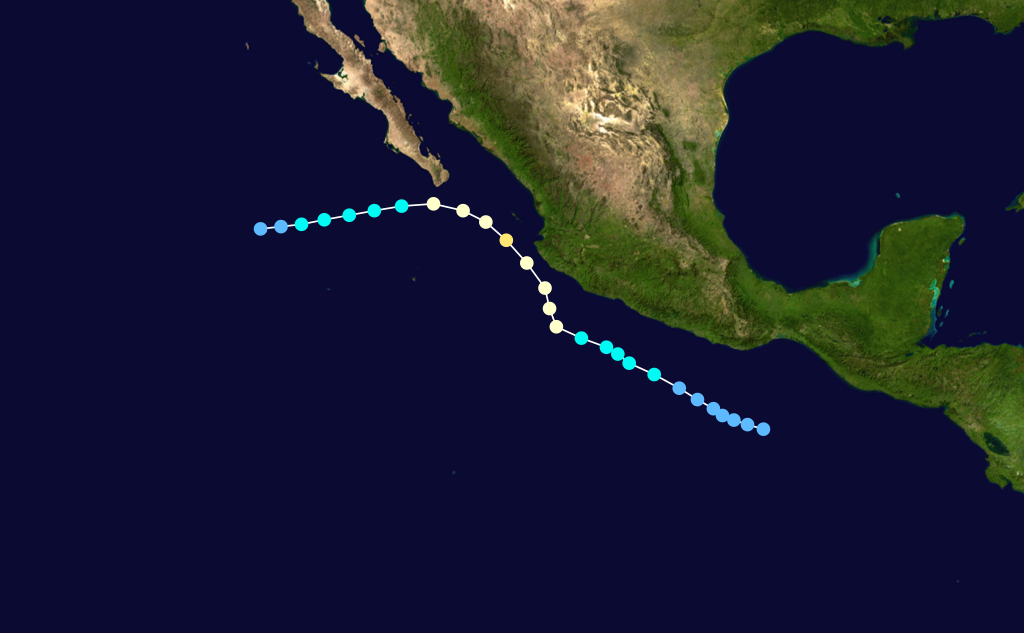
- Duration: September 3 – September 9
- Peak intensity: 100 mph (155 km/h) (1-min); ≤984 mbar (hPa)

Hurricane Nanette threatened southern Baja California but turned west before making landfall.

=== Hurricane Olivia ===
- Category 3 hurricane (SSHWS)
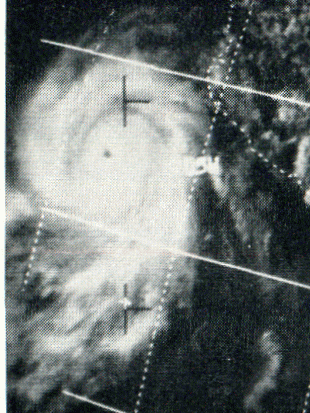
- Duration: September 20 (Entered basin) – October 1
- Peak intensity: 125 mph (205 km/h) (1-min); 948 mbar (hPa)

Olivia was a continuation of Atlantic Hurricane Irene. Olivia eventually strengthened into a Category 3 hurricane before recurving and making landfall in Baja California as a depression. The remnants of Olivia continued north into California, where they brought rain.

=== Hurricane Priscilla ===
- Category 3 hurricane (SSHWS)
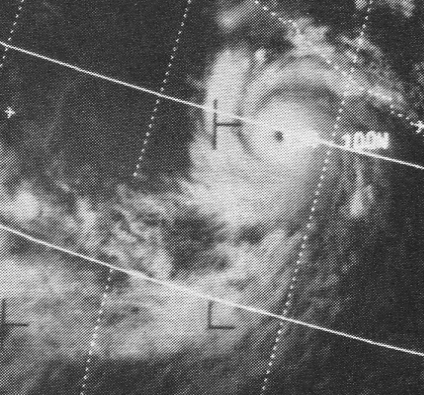
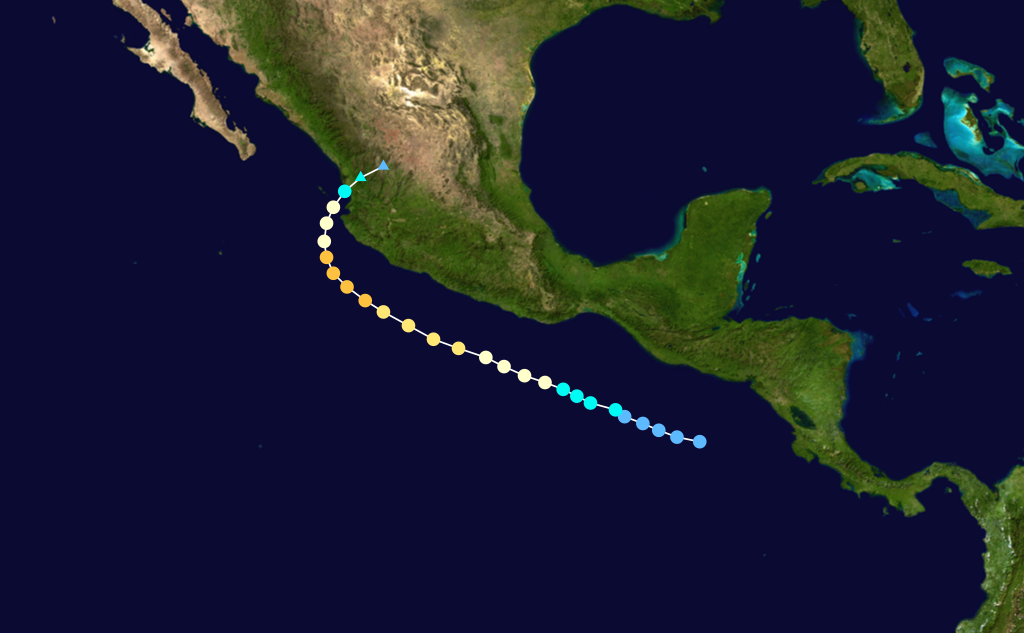
- Duration: October 6 – October 13
- Peak intensity: 125 mph (205 km/h) (1-min); 951 mbar (hPa)

Priscilla made landfall south of Mazatlán as a tropical storm. It had weakened significantly before landfall, having once been a strong Category 3 hurricane. Priscilla destroyed roughly 36,000 acres of corn, tomatoes, peppers, bananas, and cotton, resulting in $3.12 million in losses. Heavy rains inundated 30 towns in Nayarit, damaging roads and two major thoroughfares; road damage totaled $544,000.

=== Tropical Storm Ramona ===
- Tropical storm (SSHWS)
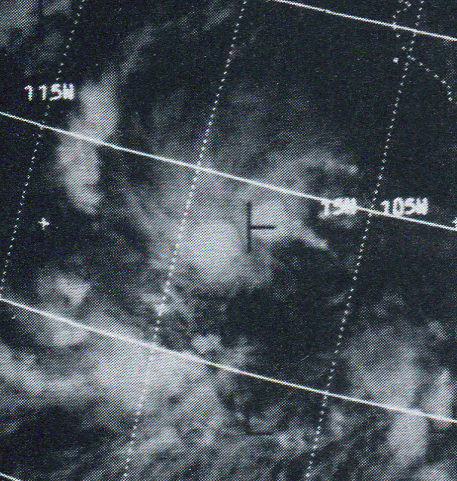
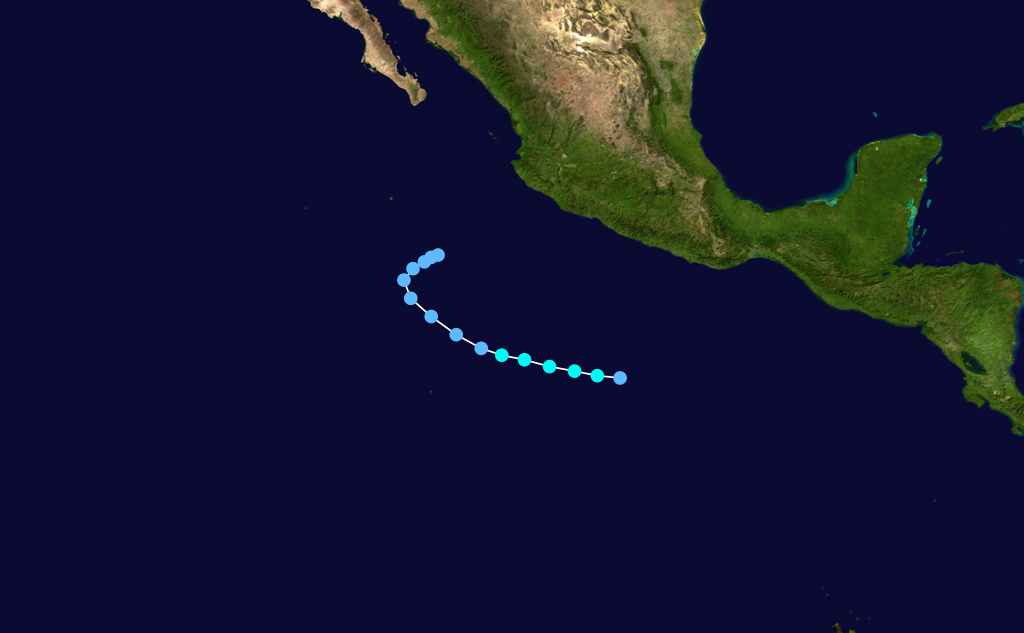
- Duration: October 28 – October 31
- Peak intensity: 60 mph (95 km/h) (1-min); 1009 mbar (hPa)

Ramona formed on October 28, it quickly strengthened into a tropical storm. It later weakened back to a tropical depression. Before dissipation, it made a sharp turn to the north-northeast. It had dissipated on October 31.

=== Tropical Storm Sharon ===
- Tropical storm (SSHWS)
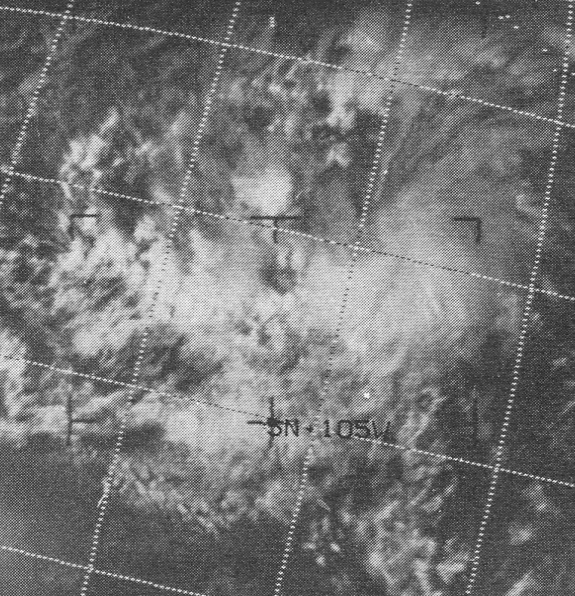
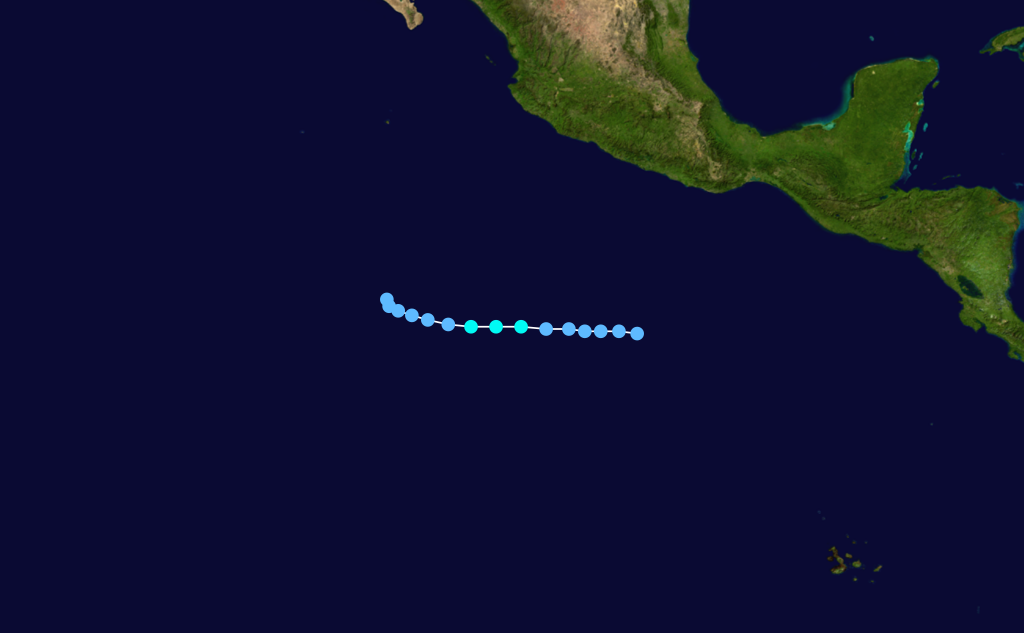
- Duration: November 25 – November 29
- Peak intensity: 40 mph (65 km/h) (1-min); ≤1009 mbar (hPa)

Tropical Storm Sharon was a late season tropical storm that formed a few hundred miles from Mexico on November 25. It slowly strengthened into a minimal tropical storm before unfavorable conditions caused it to dissipate on November 29.

== Storm names ==
The following list of names was used for named storms that formed in the North Pacific Ocean east of 140°W in 1971. This was the same set of names used for the 1967 season. A storm was named Sharon for the first time this year. No names were retired after this season, thus the same list was used again for the 1975 season.

- Agatha
- Bridget
- Carlotta
- Denise *
- Eleanor
- Francene
- Georgette
- Hilary *
- Ilsa
- Jewel
- Katrina
- Lily
- Monica
- Nanette
- Olivia
- Priscilla
- Ramona
- Sharon
- Terry (unused)
- Veronica (unused)
- Winifred (unused)

Had a named storm formed in the North Pacific between 140°W and the International Date Line in 1971 it would have been assigned a name from the west Pacific's typhoon name list by the Joint Typhoon Warning Center on Guam. Named storms in the table above that crossed into the area during the season are noted (*).

== Season effects ==
This is a table of all of the storms that formed in the 1971 Pacific hurricane season. It includes their name, duration, peak classification and intensities, areas affected, damage, and death totals. Deaths in parentheses are additional and indirect (an example of an indirect death would be a traffic accident), but were still related to that storm. Damage and deaths include totals while the storm was extratropical, a wave, or a low, and all of the damage figures are in 1971 USD.

Saffir–Simpson scale
TD	TS	C1	C2	C3	C4	C5

1971 Pacific hurricane season statistics
Storm name	Dates active	Storm category at peak intensity	Max 1-min wind mph (km/h)	Min. press. (mbar)	Areas affected	Damage (US$)	Deaths	Ref(s).
Agatha	May 21 – 25	Category 2 hurricane	100 (155)	972	Mexico	Unknown	0	
Bridget	June 14 – 20	Category 2 hurricane	100 (155)	998	Mexico	56	17	
Carlotta	July 2 – 8	Category 1 hurricane	85 (140)	980	None	None	0	
Denise	July 2 – 14	Category 4 hurricane	140 (220)	951	Hawaii	None	0	
Eleanor	July 7 – 11	Tropical storm	60 (95)	1007	None	None	0	
Francene	July 18 – 23	Category 3 hurricane	115 (185)	991	None	None	0	
Georgette	July 20 – 27	Category 1 hurricane	60 (95)	990	None	None	0	
Hilary	July 26 – August 7	Category 2 hurricane	100 (155)	964	None	None	0	
Ilsa	July 31 – August 8	Category 3 hurricane	115 (185)	978	None	None	0	
Jewel	August 6 – 11	Tropical storm	70 (110)	993	None	None	0	
Katrina	August 8 – 13	Tropical storm	65 (100)	1008	Mexico	Unknown	0	
Lily	August 28 – September 1	Category 1 hurricane	85 (140)	978	Mexico	Unknown	12-14	
Monica	August 29 – September 5	Category 3 hurricane	115 (185)	1005	None	None	0	
Nanette	September 3 – 9	Category 2 hurricane	100 (155)	984	Mexico	None	0	
Olivia	September 20 – October 1	Category 3 hurricane	115 (185)	948	Nicaragua, Mexico	Unknown	3	
Priscilla	October 6 – 13	Category 3 hurricane	125 (205)	951	Mexico	3.664	0	
Ramona	October 28 – 31	Tropical storm	60 (95)	1009	None	None	0	
Sharon	November 25 – 29	Tropical storm	40 (65)	1009	None	None	0	
Season aggregates
22 (Note: There were four other tropical cyclones which never reached tropical storm strength, but due to the unavailability of their data they are not added onto this table.) systems	May 21 – November 29		140 (220)	948	Mexico, Nicaragua	Unknown	52	

== See also ==
- List of Pacific hurricanes
- Pacific hurricane season
- 1971 Atlantic hurricane season
- 1971 Pacific typhoon season
- 1971 North Indian Ocean cyclone season
- Australian cyclone seasons: 1970–71, 1971–72
- South Pacific cyclone seasons: 1970–71, 1971–72
- South-West Indian Ocean cyclone seasons: 1970–71, 1971–72
