= 1973 hurricane season =

1973 hurricane season may refer to:

- The 1973 Atlantic hurricane season
- The 1973 Pacific hurricane season
