= 1973 North Indian Ocean cyclone season =

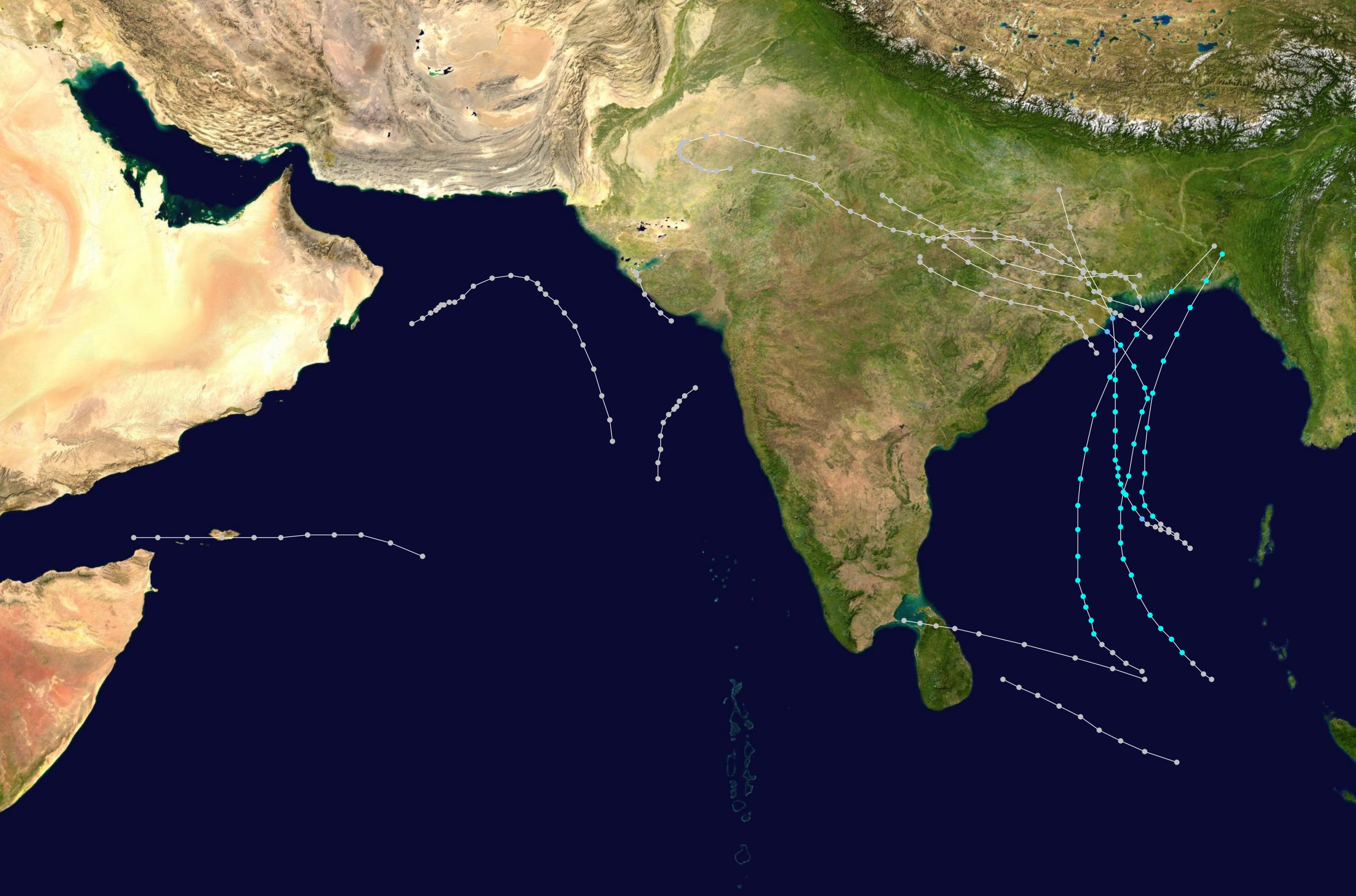
- Season summary map

Seasonal boundaries
- First system formed: May 28, 1973
- Last system dissipated: December 9, 1973

Seasonal statistics
- Depressions: 20
- Deep depressions: 2
- Cyclonic storms: 6
- Severe cyclonic storms: 4
- Total fatalities: Unknown
- Total damage: Unknown

Related articles
- 1973 Atlantic hurricane season; 1973 Pacific hurricane season; 1973 Pacific typhoon season

The 1973 North Indian Ocean cyclone season was part of the annual cycle of tropical cyclone formation. The season has no official bounds but cyclones tend to form between April and December. These dates conventionally delimit the period of each year when most tropical cyclones form in the northern Indian Ocean. There are two main seas in the North Indian Ocean—the Bay of Bengal to the east of the Indian subcontinent and the Arabian Sea to the west of India. The official Regional Specialized Meteorological Centre in this basin is the India Meteorological Department (IMD), while the Joint Typhoon Warning Center (JTWC) releases unofficial advisories. An average of five tropical cyclones form in the North Indian Ocean every season with peaks in May and November. Cyclones occurring between the meridians 45°E and 100°E are included in the season by the IMD.

== Systems ==
=== Tropical Depression One (01A) ===
- Deep depression (IMD)
- Tropical depression (SSHWS)
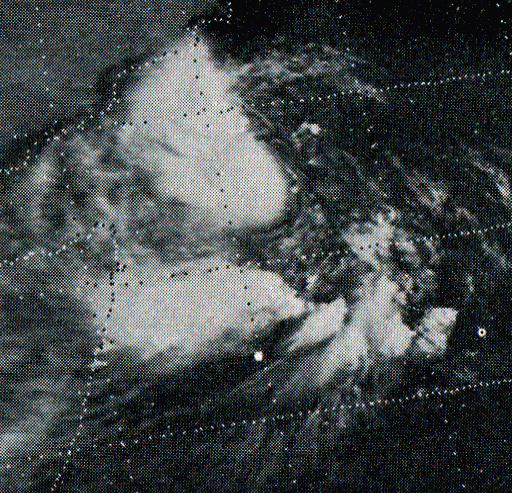
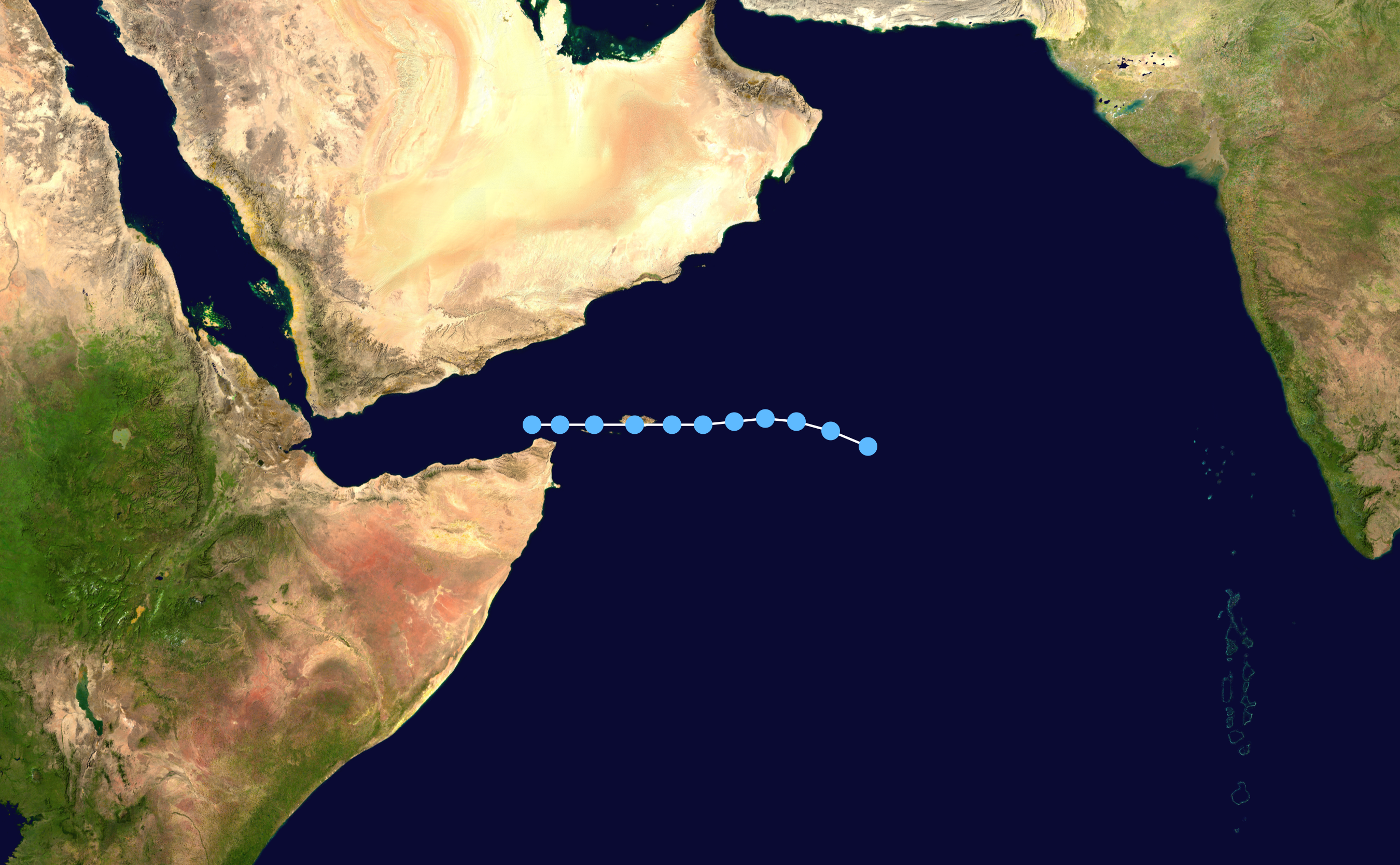
- Duration: May 27 – May 29
- Peak intensity: 55 km/h (35 mph) (3-min);

This system formed in the Arabian Sea on May 27 and struck the Arabian peninsula on May 28, becoming the tenth system to affect the region since 1891.

=== Tropical Storm Two (02A) ===
- Deep depression (IMD)
- Tropical storm (SSHWS)
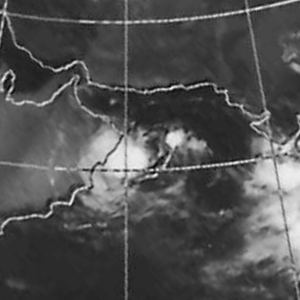
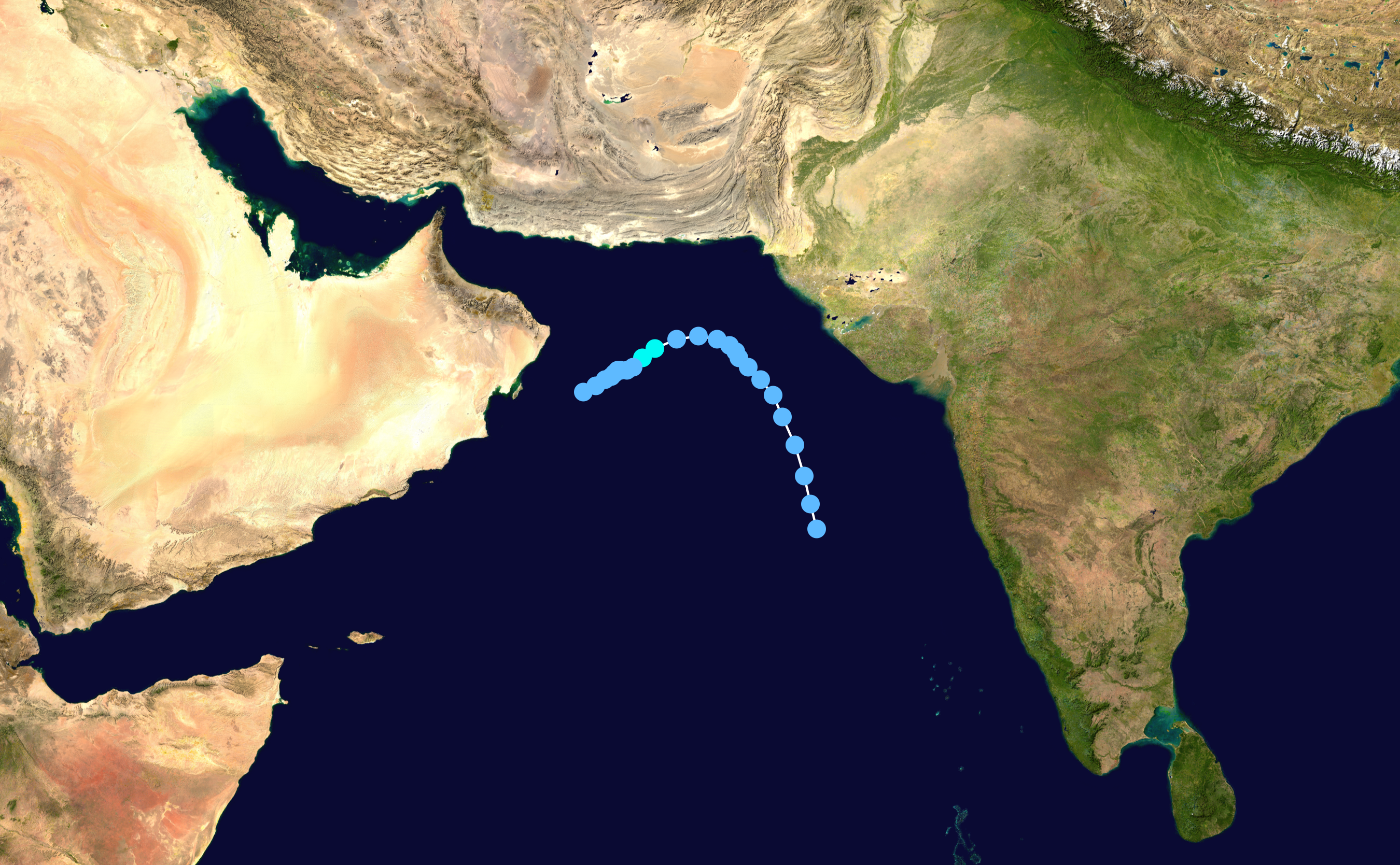
- Duration: June 6 – June 12
- Peak intensity: 55 km/h (35 mph) (3-min);

=== Tropical Storm Six (06B) ===
- Deep depression (IMD)
- Tropical storm (SSHWS)
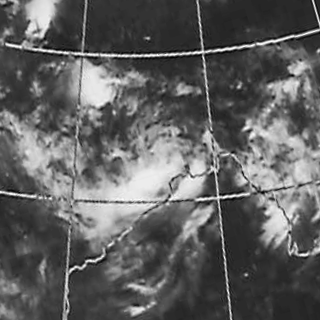
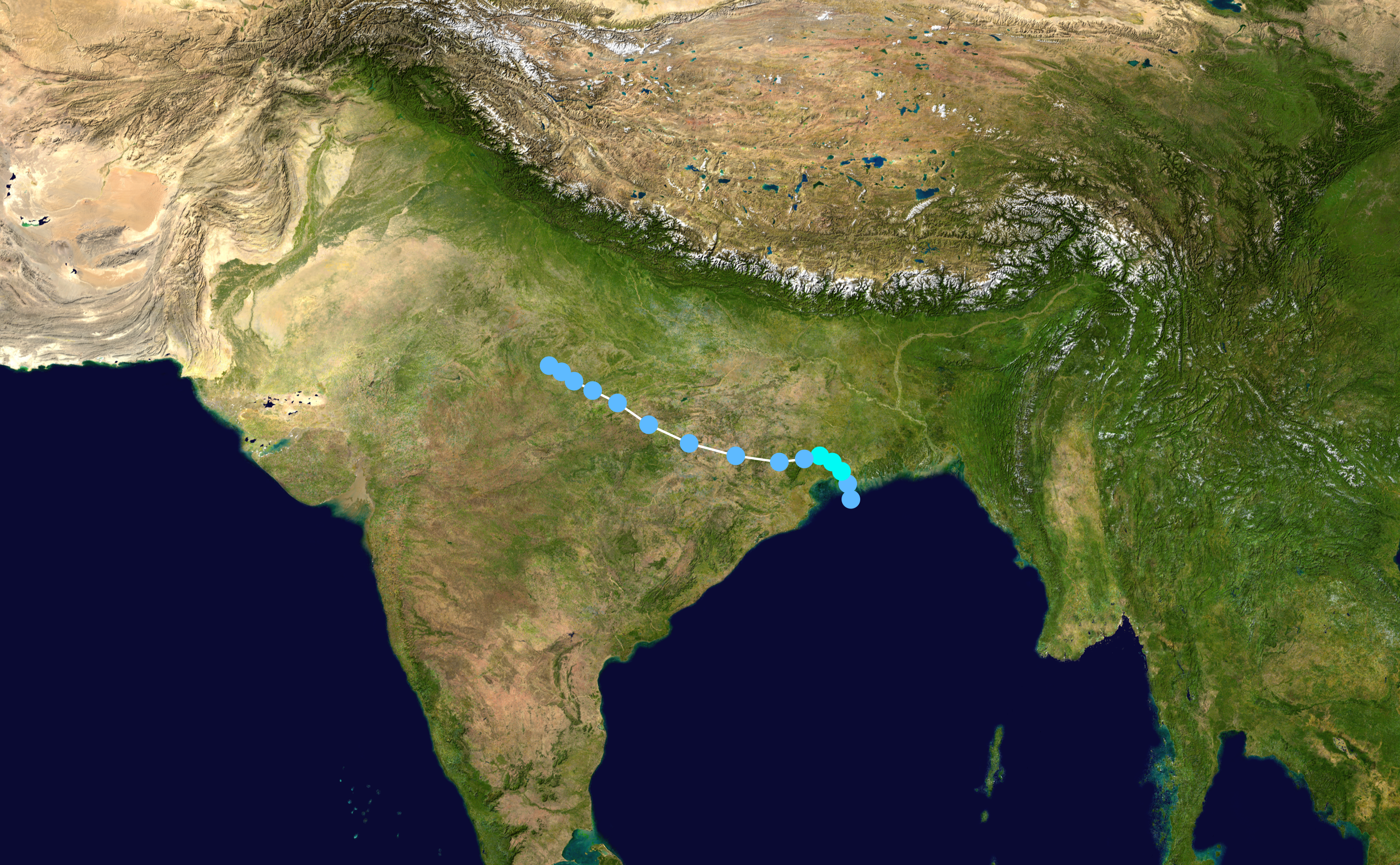
- Duration: June 19 – June 22
- Peak intensity: 55 km/h (35 mph) (3-min);

=== Tropical Storm Ten (10B) ===
- Cyclonic storm (IMD)
- Tropical storm (SSHWS)
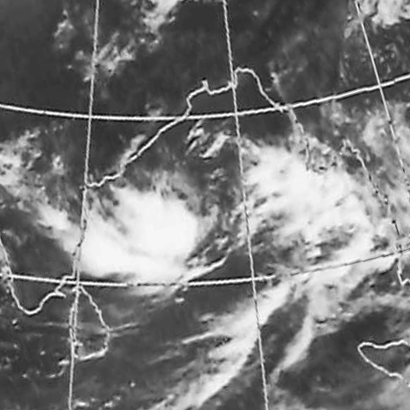
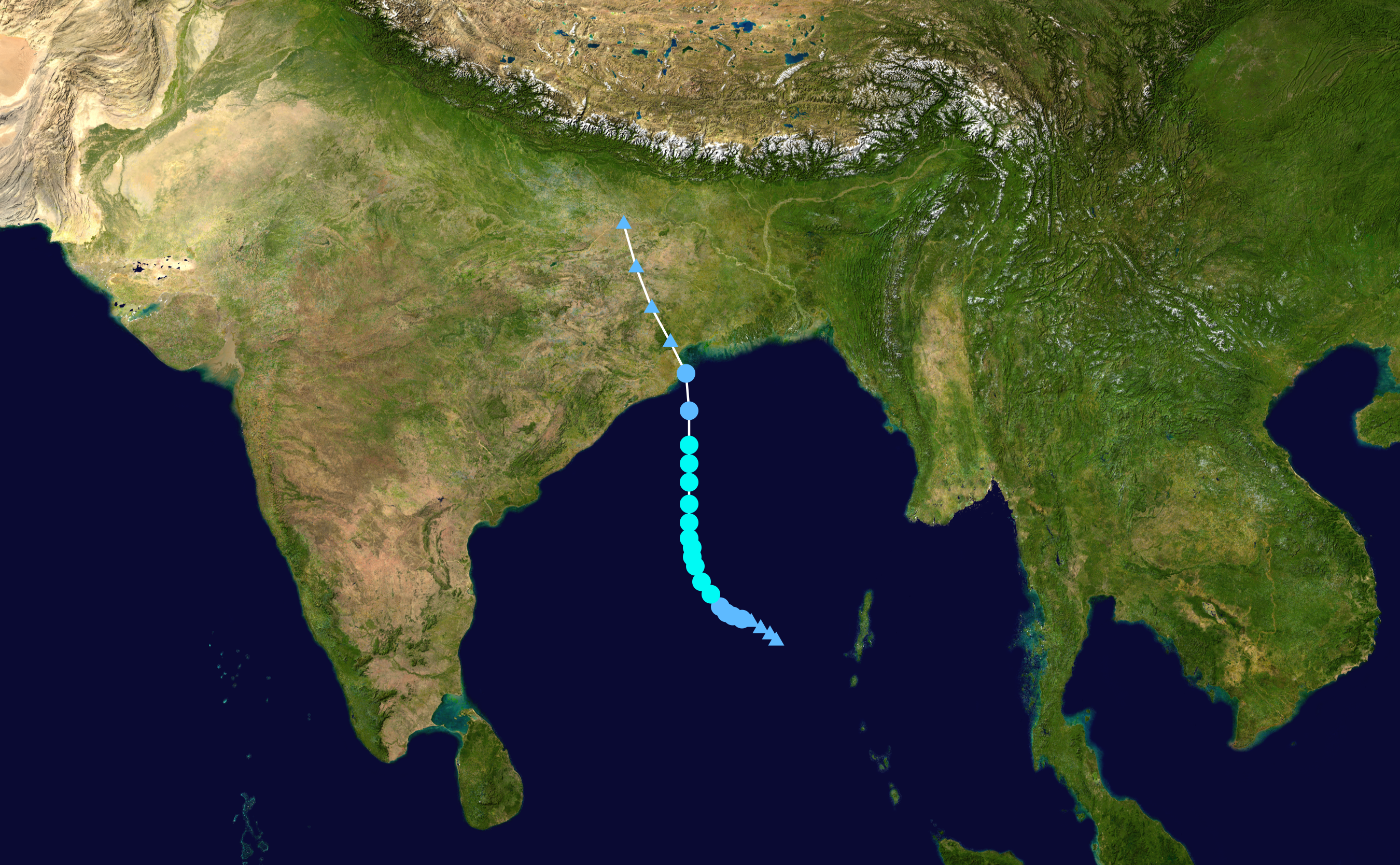
- Duration: October 6 – October 12
- Peak intensity: 85 km/h (50 mph) (3-min);

=== Tropical Storm Twelve (12B) ===
- Severe cyclonic storm (IMD)
- Tropical storm (SSHWS)
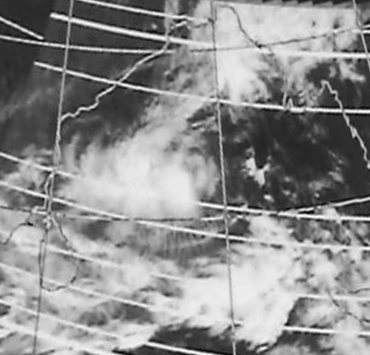
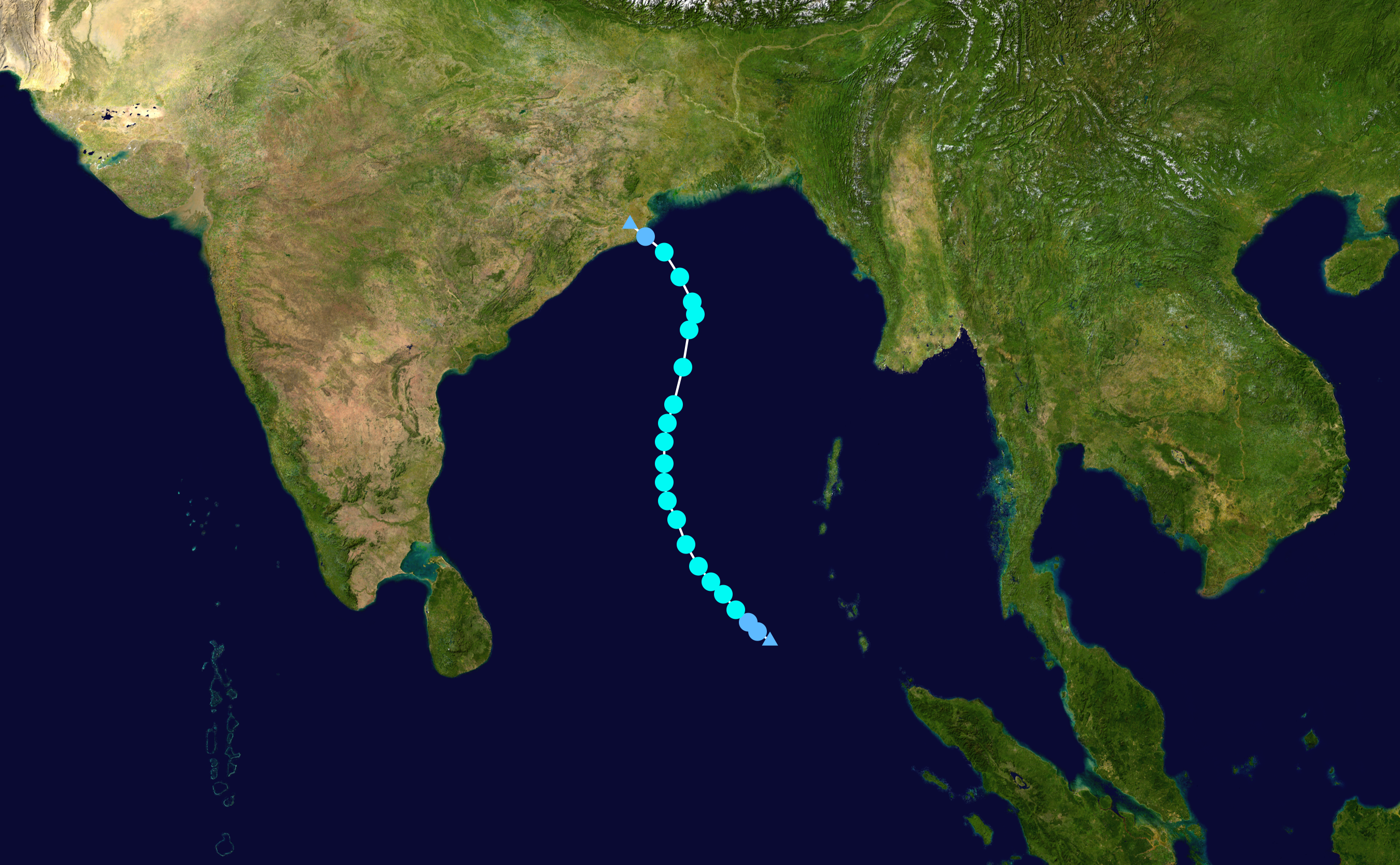
- Duration: November 3 – November 9
- Peak intensity: 100 km/h (65 mph) (3-min);

This system formed on 3 November and intensified up to Severe Cyclonic Storm and to a high-end tropical storm by 8 November. On 9 November, the storm made landfall at Paradip in Odisha and dissipated rapidly within six hours after the landfall as the storm interacted with a trough. Paradip and Chandbali reported gust winds up to 110 kmph. This cyclone caused considerable agricultural damages to crops there but deaths are unknown.

=== Tropical Storm Thirteen (13B) ===
- Severe cyclonic storm (IMD)
- Tropical storm (SSHWS)
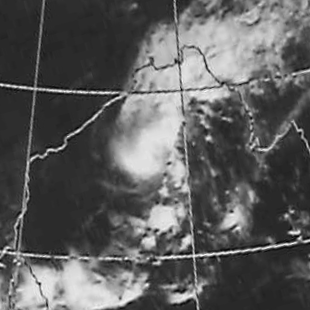
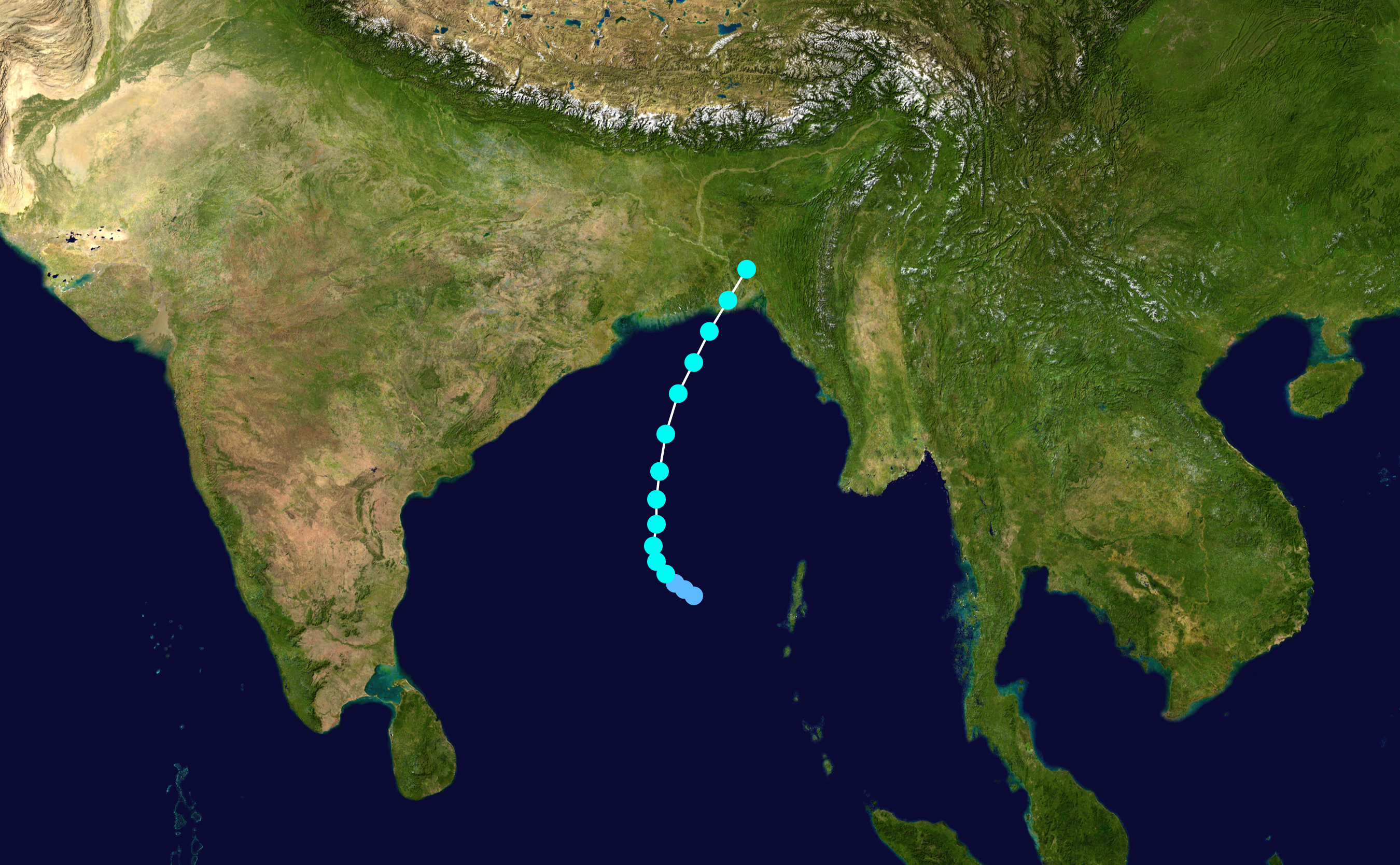
- Duration: November 14 – November 18
- Peak intensity: 95 km/h (60 mph) (3-min);

=== Tropical Storm Fourteen (14B) ===
- Severe cyclonic storm (IMD)
- Tropical storm (SSHWS)
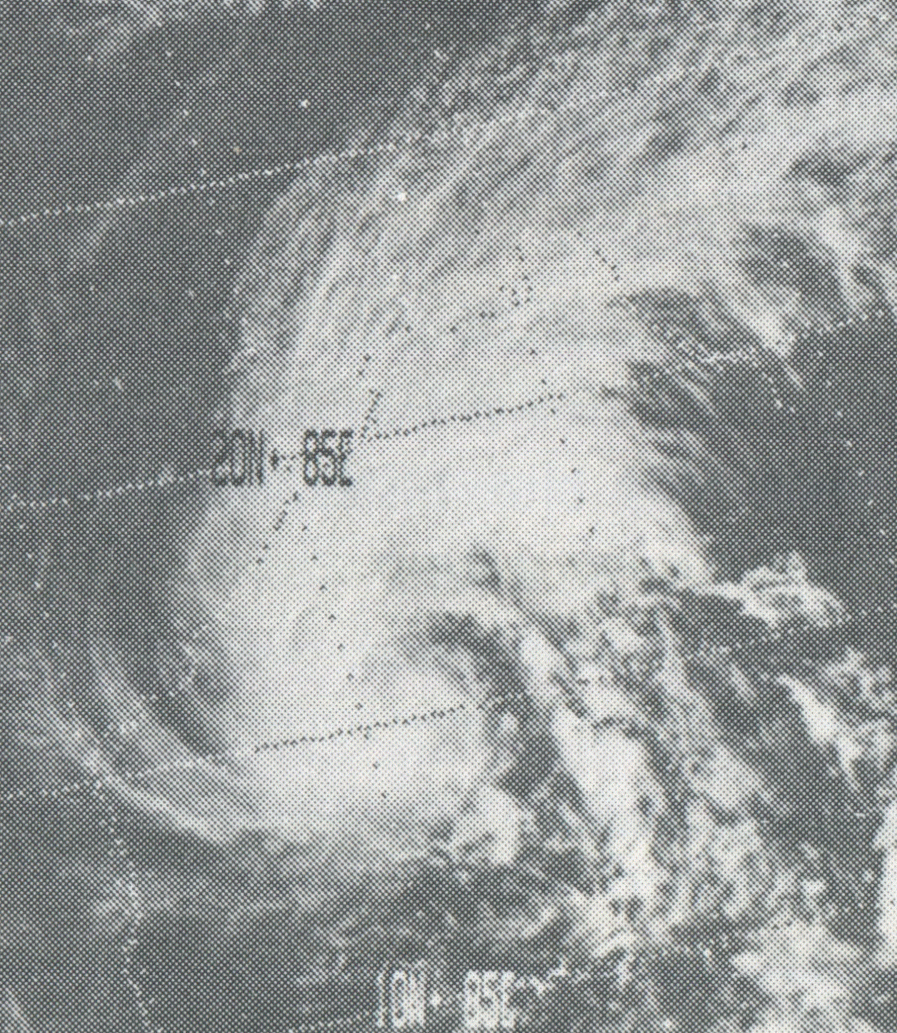
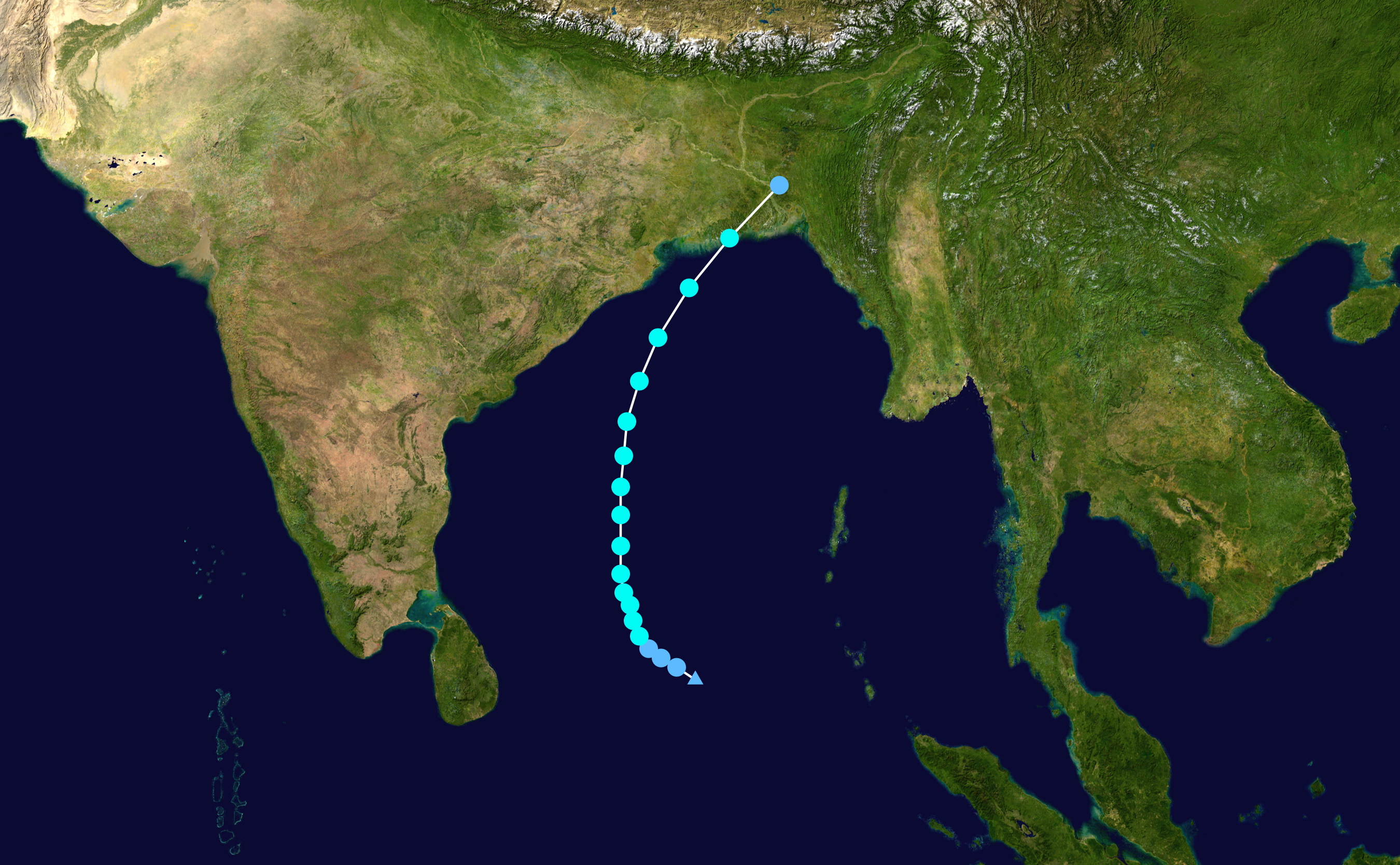
- Duration: December 5 – December 9
- Peak intensity: 110 km/h (70 mph) (3-min);

This system formed as a tropical depression in the southern Bay on December 5, strengthening into a tropical storm as it turned north-northwest on December 5, then to near-hurricane strength on December 6. The cyclone recurved, striking Indian near Calcutta on December 9, though its main impacts were across Bangladesh.

== See also ==
- North Indian Ocean tropical cyclone
- 1973 Atlantic hurricane season
- 1973 Pacific hurricane season
- 1973 Pacific typhoon season
- Australian cyclone seasons: 1972–73, 1973–74
- South Pacific cyclone seasons: 1972–73, 1973–74
- South-West Indian Ocean cyclone seasons: 1972–73, 1973–74
