= Hurricane Delia =

Category 1 Atlantic hurricane in 1973

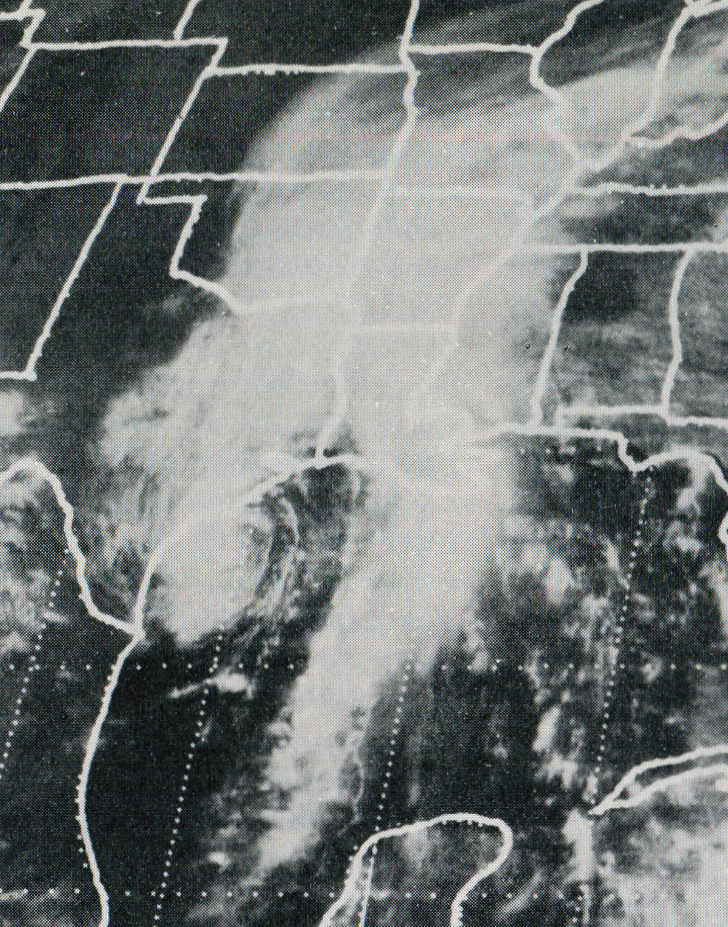
- Satellite image of Delia on September 5

Meteorological history
- Formed: September 1, 1973
- Dissipated: September 7, 1973

Category 1 hurricane
- 1-minute sustained (SSHWS/NWS)
- Highest winds: 85 mph (140 km/h)
- Lowest pressure: 986 mbar (hPa); 29.12 inHg

Overall effects
- Fatalities: 2 direct, 3 indirect
- Damage: $6 million (1973 USD)
- Areas affected: Mexico and the Southern United States
- IBTrACS
- Part of the 1973 Atlantic hurricane season

Hurricane Delia was the first tropical cyclone on record to make landfall in the same city twice. Forming out of a tropical wave on September 1, 1973, Delia gradually strengthened into a tropical storm as it moved north by September 3. After reaching this strength, the storm turned more westward and further intensified, nearly attaining hurricane status the next day. The storm peaked with winds of 85 mph (140 km/h) and a barometric pressure of 986 mbar (hPa; 29.12 inHg). Several hours later, Delia made landfall near Freeport, Texas; however, the storm began to execute a counterclockwise loop, causing it to move back over the Gulf of Mexico. On September 5, the storm made another landfall in Freeport before weakening to a depression. The remnants of Delia eventually dissipated early on September 7 over northern Mexico.

Due to the erratic movement of the storm along the Texas coastline, significant rainfall fell in areas near the center and in parts of Louisiana. This led to widespread flooding, especially of farmland, that left $6 million in damages. Five people were killed during the storm.

== Meteorological history ==
Map plotting the storm's track and intensity, according to the Saffir–Simpson scale Map key Saffir–Simpson scale Tropical depression (≤38 mph, ≤62 km/h) Tropical storm (39–73 mph, 63–118 km/h) Category 1 (74–95 mph, 119–153 km/h) Category 2 (96–110 mph, 154–177 km/h) Category 3 (111–129 mph, 178–208 km/h) Category 4 (130–156 mph, 209–251 km/h) Category 5 (≥157 mph, ≥252 km/h) Unknown Storm type Tropical cyclone Subtropical cyclone Extratropical cyclone, remnant low, tropical disturbance, or monsoon depression

Hurricane Delia originated from a tropical wave that formed over the central Caribbean Sea in late August 1973. Tracking towards the west-northwest, convective activity increased and the overall structure of the system improved. By August 31, a weak area of low pressure formed over the Gulf of Honduras. This system tracked northward and further organized into a tropical depression just off the southeastern coast of the Yucatán Peninsula on September 1. Gradually intensifying, the depression became a tropical storm on September 3 as it turned towards the west. In accordance with its upgrade, it was given the name Delia. This upgrade followed a reconnaissance mission into the system that found sustained winds of 50 mph (85 km/h). A complex steering pattern formed later that day, resulting in a more hostile environment for the cyclone.

As Delia neared the Texas coastline, it managed to intensify into a Category 1 hurricane with winds of 85 mph (140 km/h) and reconnaissance reported winds well in excess of hurricane-force in numerous squalls associated with the storm. The lowest pressure was recorded at 986 mbar (hPa; 29.12 inHg). Delia subsequently made its first landfall at Freeport, Texas late on September 4. After executing a counterclockwise loop, the storm made its second landfall in Freeport on September 5. After moving inland, the storm quickly weakened, becoming a depression on September 6 before dissipating early the next day over northern Mexico.

== Preparations and impact ==
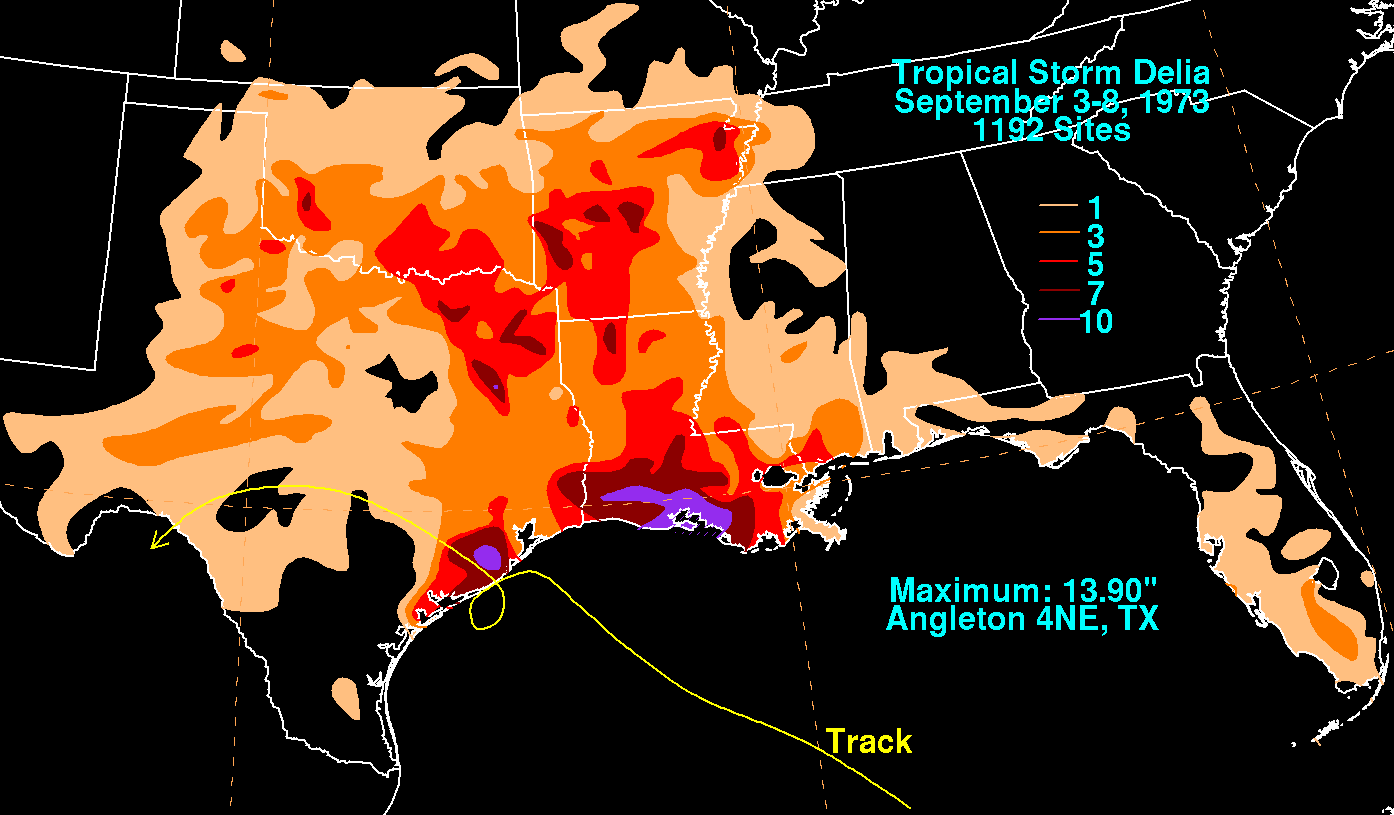
Rainfall from Hurricane Delia

On September 3, the National Hurricane Center (NHC) issued gale warnings and hurricane watches for areas between Lake Charles, Louisiana and the mouth of the Mississippi. Later that day, they were extended westward to Palacios, Texas and eventually, warnings for areas east of Morgan City, Louisiana were canceled. Due to the unexpected loop taken by Delia, gale warnings were extended as far south as Baffin Bay, Texas. By September 6, the NHC discontinued all watches and warnings associated with the storm. Around this time, the National Weather Service issued flood warnings, and warned residents about the possibility of tornadoes forming with the weakening tropical cyclone. In Cameron, Louisiana, an estimated 6,000 residents were evacuated with memories of Hurricane Audrey, a storm that killed 575 in the city, still fresh.

Due to the erratic track of the storm along the Texas coastline, widespread heavy rains fell in areas near the storm and in Louisiana. Tides up to 6 ft (1.8 m), in addition to rainfall up to 13.9 in (350 mm), caused significant flooding in the Galveston-Freeport area. Up to $3 million was reported in damages to homes due to the flooding. In southern Louisiana, rainfall peaked at 13.34 in (339 mm) in New Iberia. The rains led to widespread flooding, particularly in agricultural areas. Damages to crops amounted to $3 million. In addition to the flooding rains produced by Delia, eight tornadoes also touched down due to the storm, injuring four people. Five people were killed during Delia, two of which were directly related to the storm. Two of the other deaths resulted from a car crash, triggered by slick roads, with the two occupants of a pickup truck being killed. The fifth death resulted occurred while a man was boarding up his home and suffered a stress-induced heart attack. The outer bands of the storm also produced significant rainfall in Arkansas and Oklahoma, peaking at 9.72 in (247 mm) and 8.22 in (209 mm) respectively.

== See also ==
- 1973 Atlantic hurricane season
