= 1972–73 South Pacific cyclone season =

Tropical cyclone season

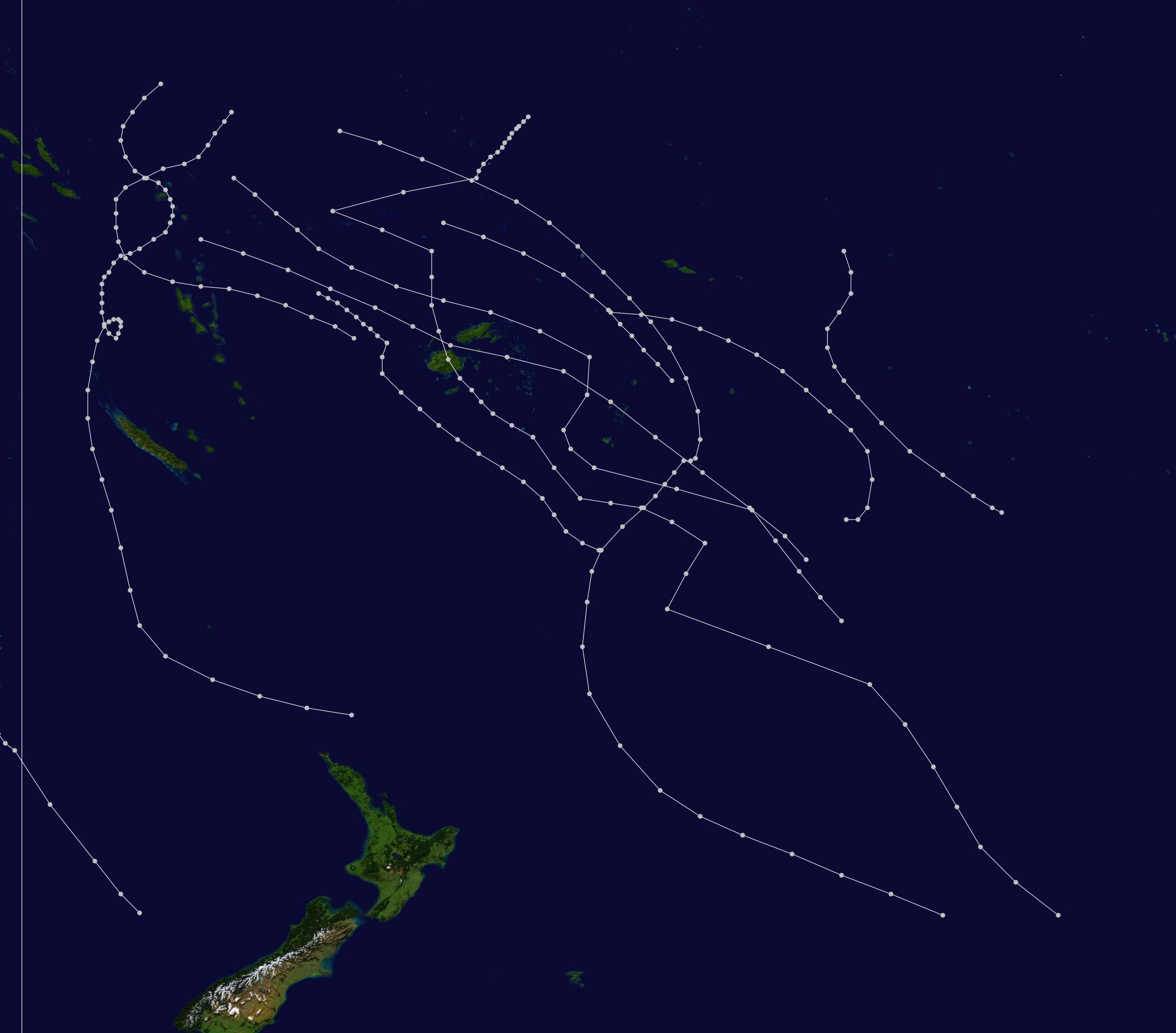
- Season summary map

Seasonal boundaries
- First system formed: October 19, 1972
- Last system dissipated: April 6, 1973

Strongest storm
- Name: Bebe
  - Maximum winds: 155 km/h (100 mph) (10-minute sustained)
  - Lowest pressure: 945 hPa (mbar)

Seasonal statistics
- Total disturbances: 8
- Tropical cyclones: 8
- Severe tropical cyclones: 2
- Total fatalities: 24
- Total damage: $20 million ( USD)

Related articles
- 1972–73 Australian region cyclone season; 1972–73 South-West Indian Ocean cyclone season

The 1972–73 South Pacific cyclone season ran year-round from July 1 to June 30. Tropical cyclone activity in the Southern Hemisphere reaches its peak from mid-February to early March.

== Systems ==
=== Severe Tropical Cyclone Bebe ===
- Category 3 severe tropical cyclone (Australian scale)
- Category 3 tropical cyclone (SSHWS)
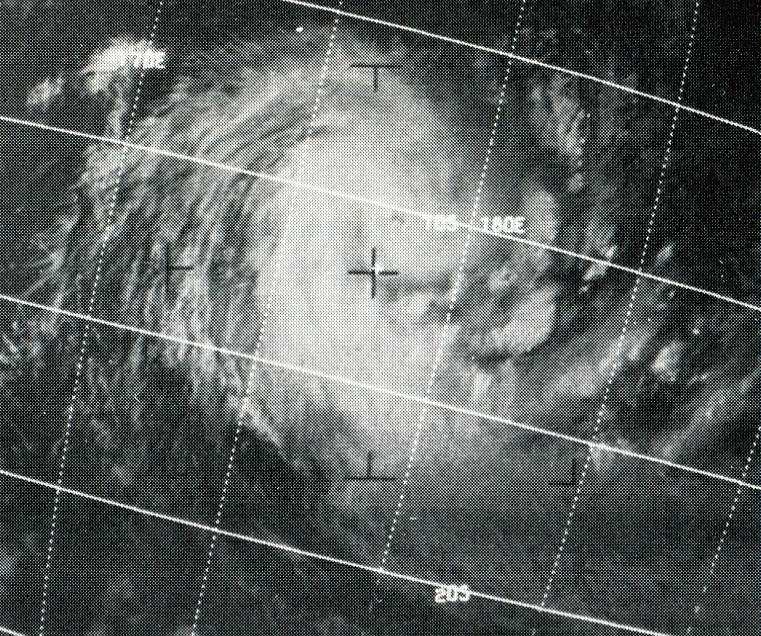
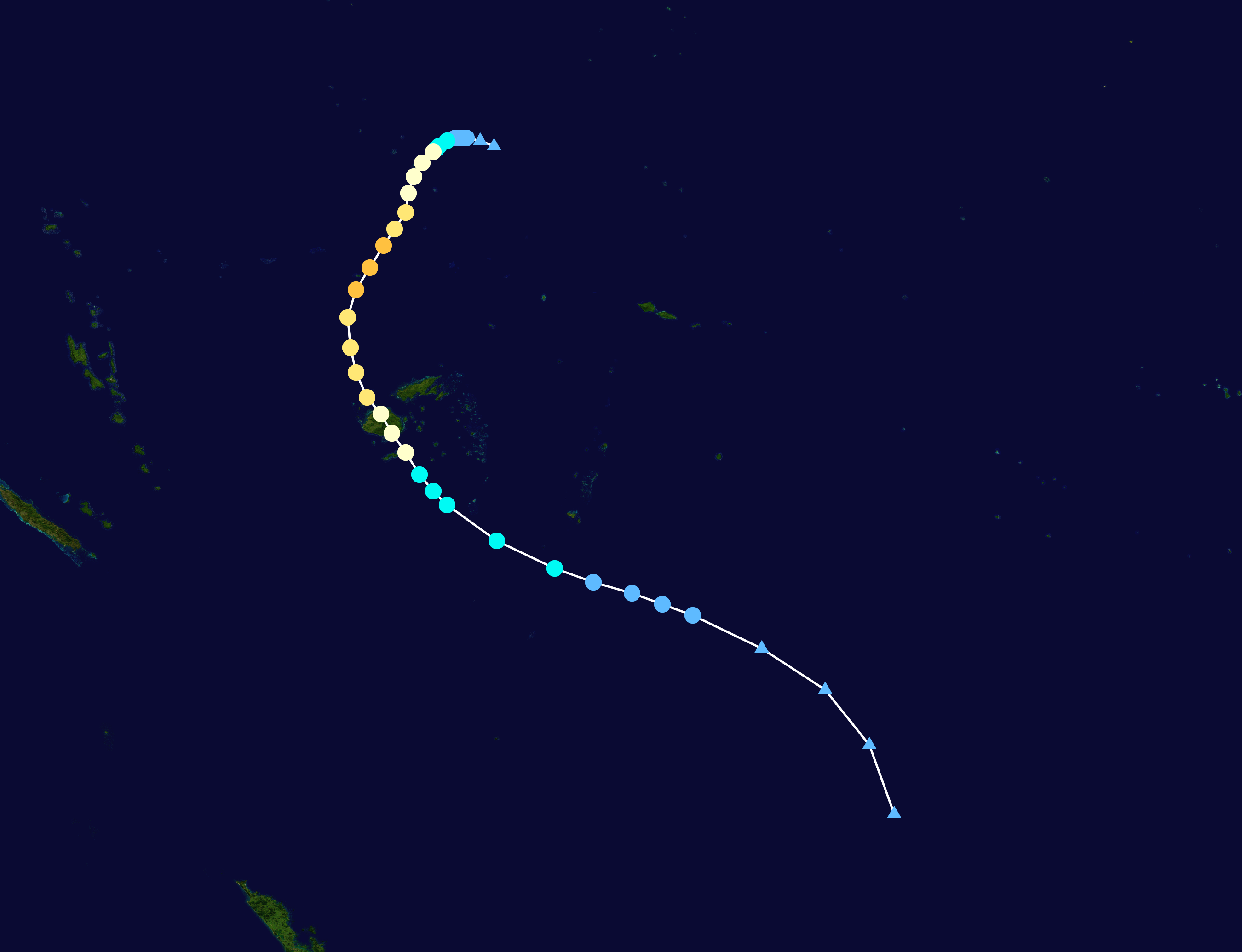
- Duration: October 19 – October 28
- Peak intensity: 155 km/h (100 mph) (10-min); 945 hPa (mbar)

Tropical Cyclone Bebe was a pre-season storm that impacted the Gilbert, Ellice, and Fiji island groups. First spotted on October 20, the system intensified and grew in size through October 22. Its course began along a south-southwest trajectory before recurving near the 14th parallel south, which resulted in a south-southeast motion through the western portion of the Fiji island group. It became the first cyclone to impact Fiji since 1952. On October 24, winds of 150 knots (280 km/h) or more were reported on Rotuma and Viti Levu. Cyclone Bebe passed through Funafuti on Saturday 21st and Sunday 22 October 1972. At about 4 p.m. on the 21st, sea water was bubbling through the coral on the airfield with the water reaching a height of about 4 –5 feet high. The Ellice Islands Colony's ship Moanaraoi was in the lagoon and survived, however 3 tuna boats were wrecked. Waves broke over the atoll. Five people died, two adults and a 3 month old child were swept away by waves, and two sailors from the tuna boats were drowned. Cyclone Bebe knocked down 90% of the houses and trees. The storm surge created a wall of coral rubble along the ocean side of Funafuti and Funafala that was about ten to twelve miles long, and about ten to twenty feet thick at the bottom. The cyclone submerged Funafuti and sources of drinking water were contaminated as a result of the system's storm surge and fresh water flooding. After passing by the archipelago, Bebe transitioned into an extratropical cyclone, with the remnants last noted on October 28. A total of 28 people died and thousands were left homeless. Damages totaled $20 million (1972 USD).

=== Tropical Cyclone Collette ===
- Category 1 tropical cyclone (Australian scale)
- Tropical storm (SSHWS)
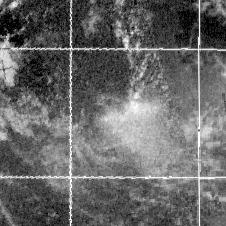
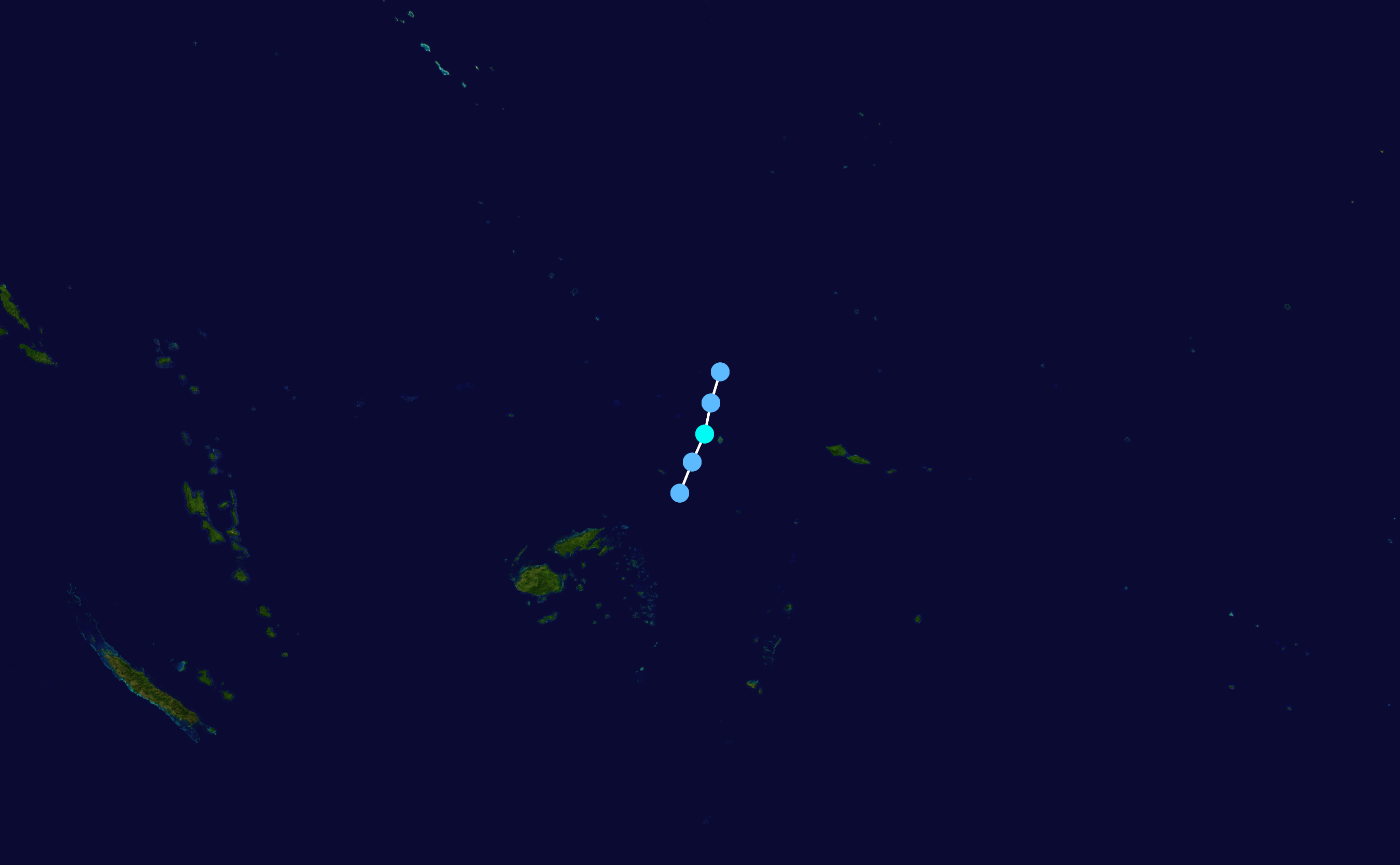
- Duration: November 2 – November 3
- Peak intensity: 75 km/h (45 mph) (10-min); 990 hPa (mbar)

Collette existed from November 2 to November 3.

=== Severe Tropical Cyclone Diana ===
- Category 3 severe tropical cyclone (Australian scale)
- Category 2 tropical cyclone (SSHWS)
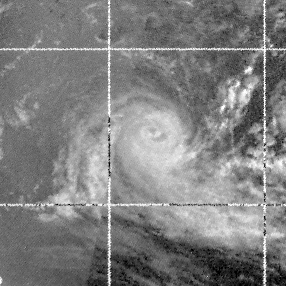
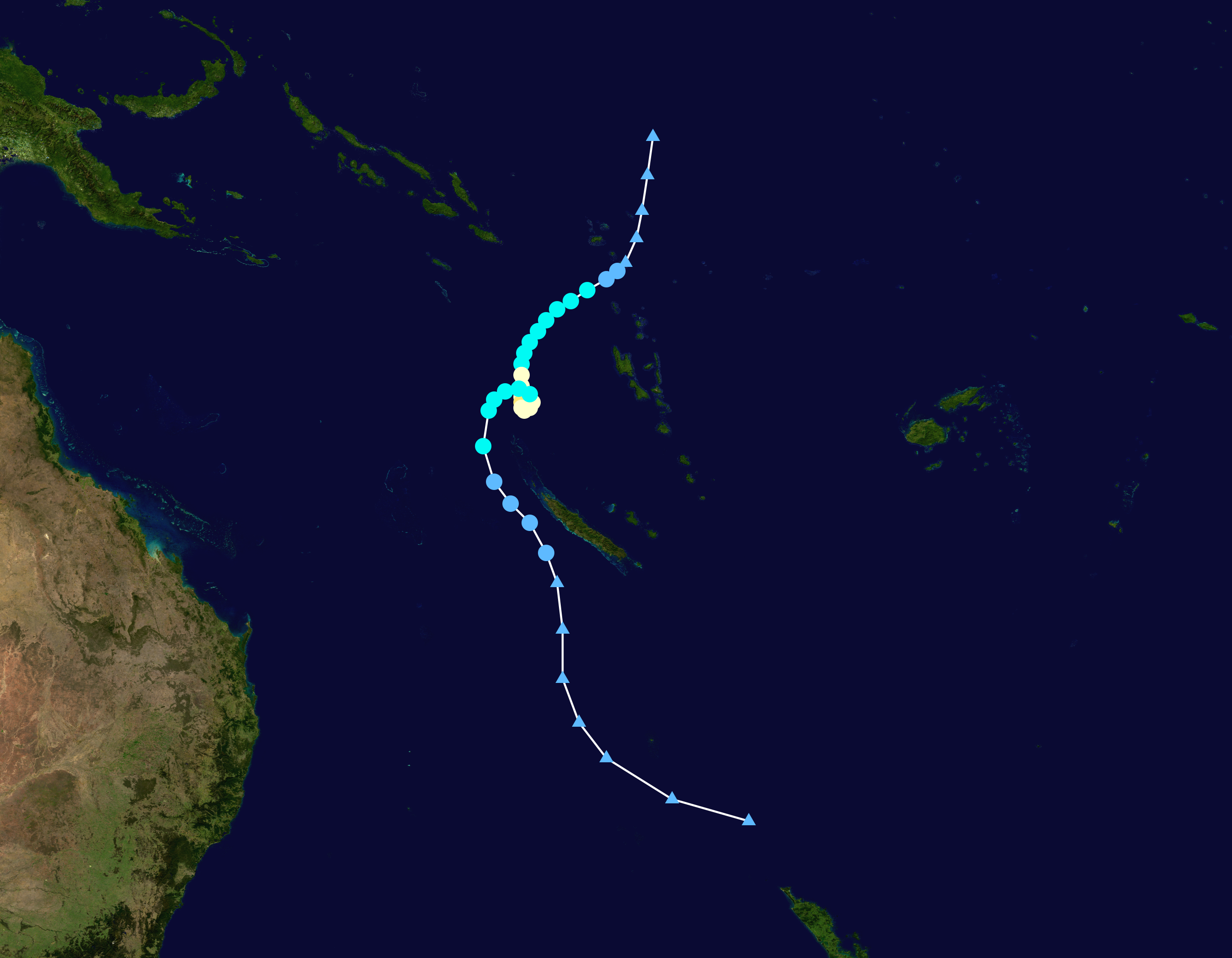
- Duration: December 8 – December 18
- Peak intensity: 130 km/h (80 mph) (10-min); 965 hPa (mbar)

Diana existed from December 6 to December 18.

=== Tropical Cyclone Felicity ===
- Category 1 tropical cyclone (Australian scale)
- Tropical storm (SSHWS)
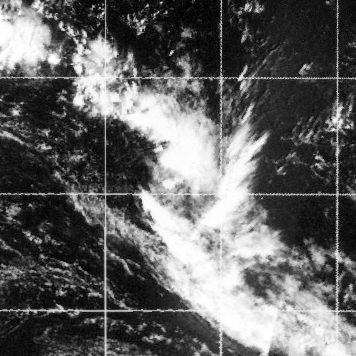
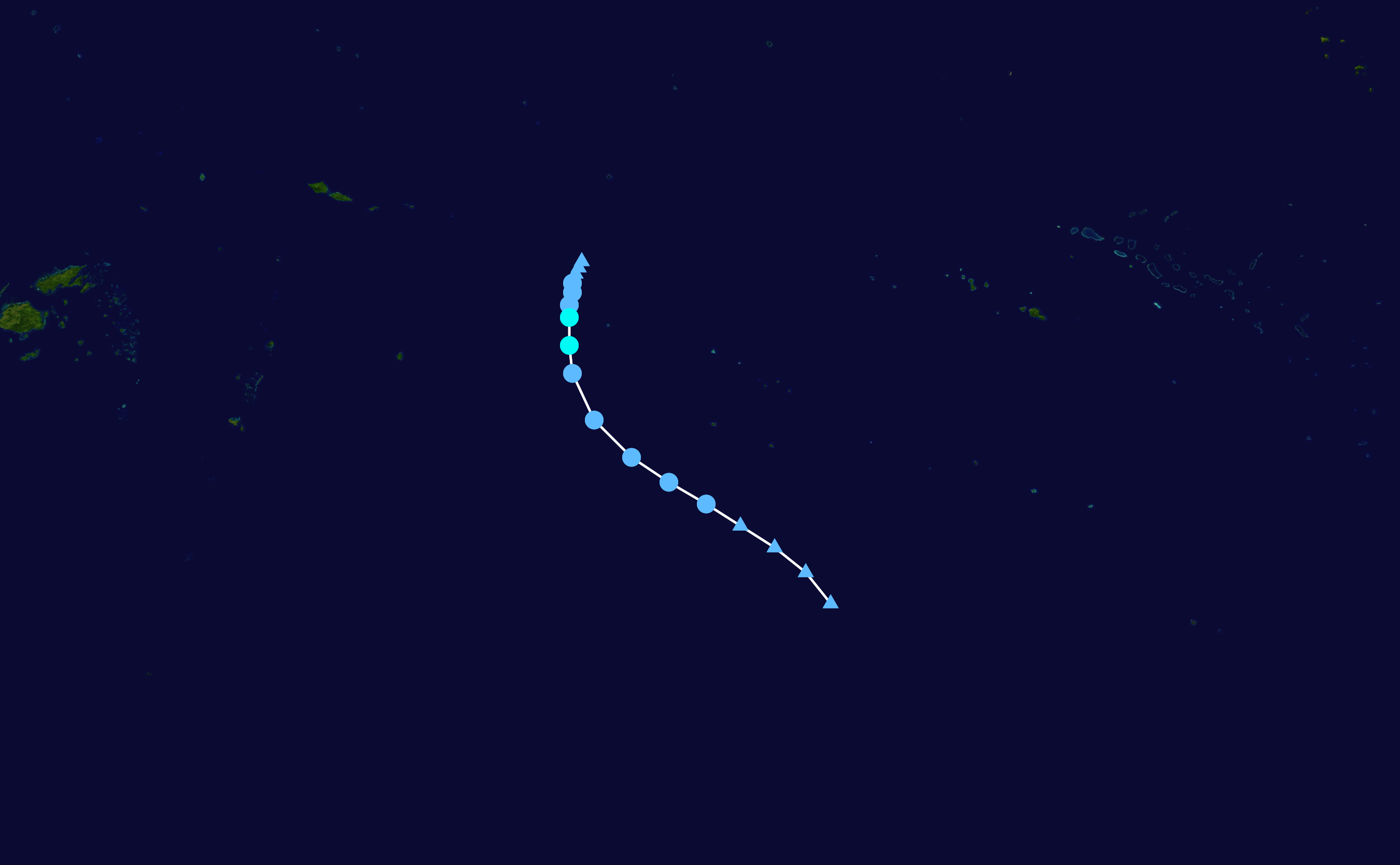
- Duration: January 14 – January 18
- Peak intensity: 75 km/h (45 mph) (10-min); 990 hPa (mbar)

Felicity existed from January 14 to January 18.

=== Tropical Cyclone Elenore ===
- Category 2 tropical cyclone (Australian scale)
- Tropical storm (SSHWS)
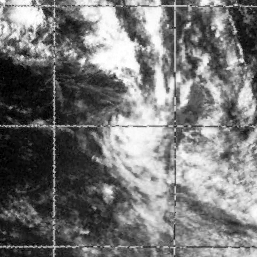
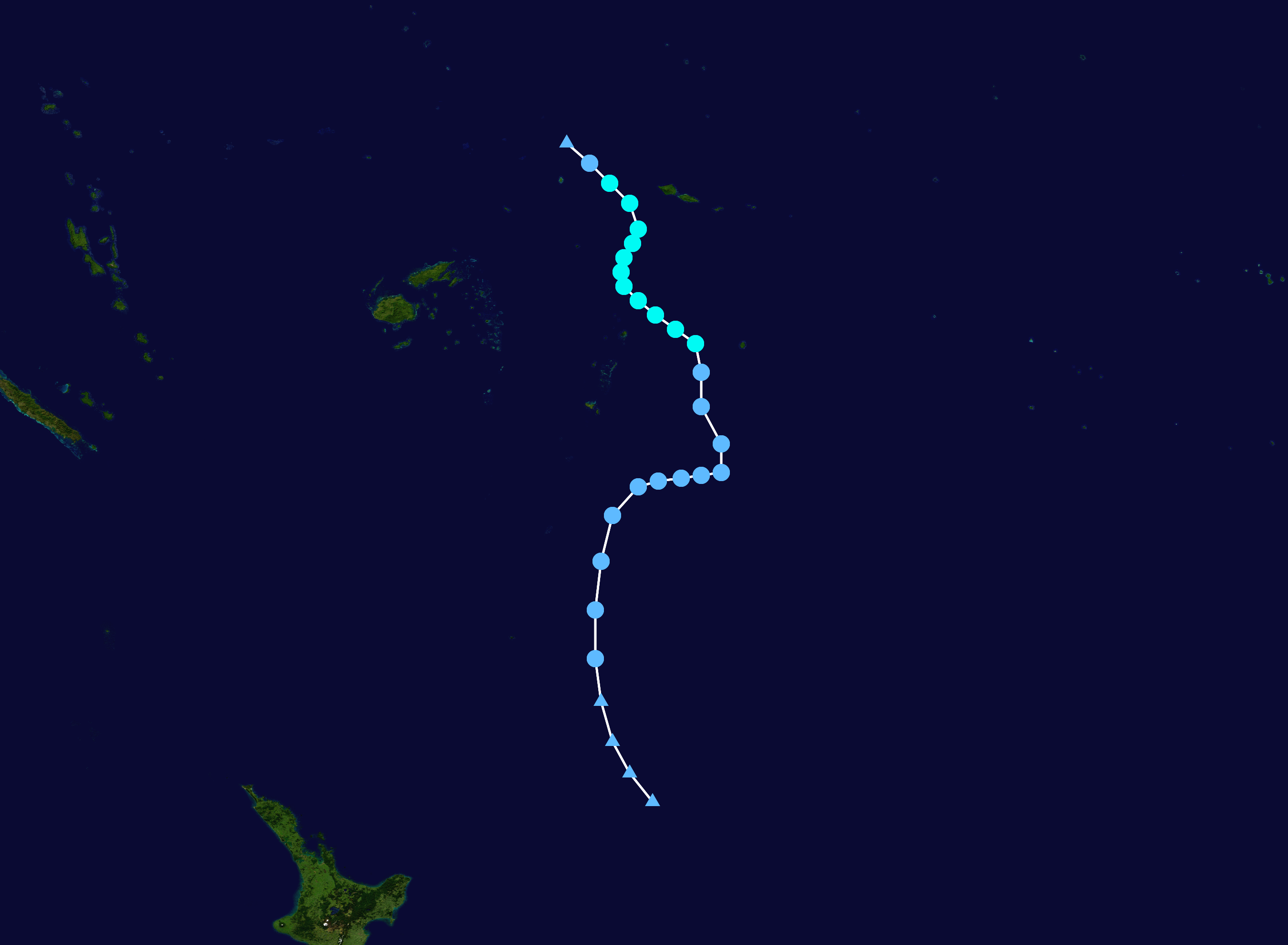
- Duration: January 31 – February 7
- Peak intensity: 100 km/h (65 mph) (10-min); 980 hPa (mbar)

Elenore existed from January 31 to February 7.

=== Tropical Cyclone Glenda ===
- Category 1 tropical cyclone (Australian scale)
- Tropical storm (SSHWS)
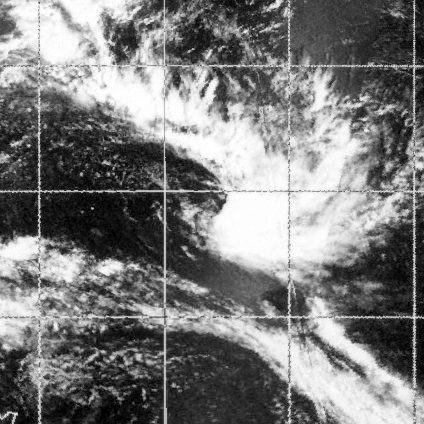
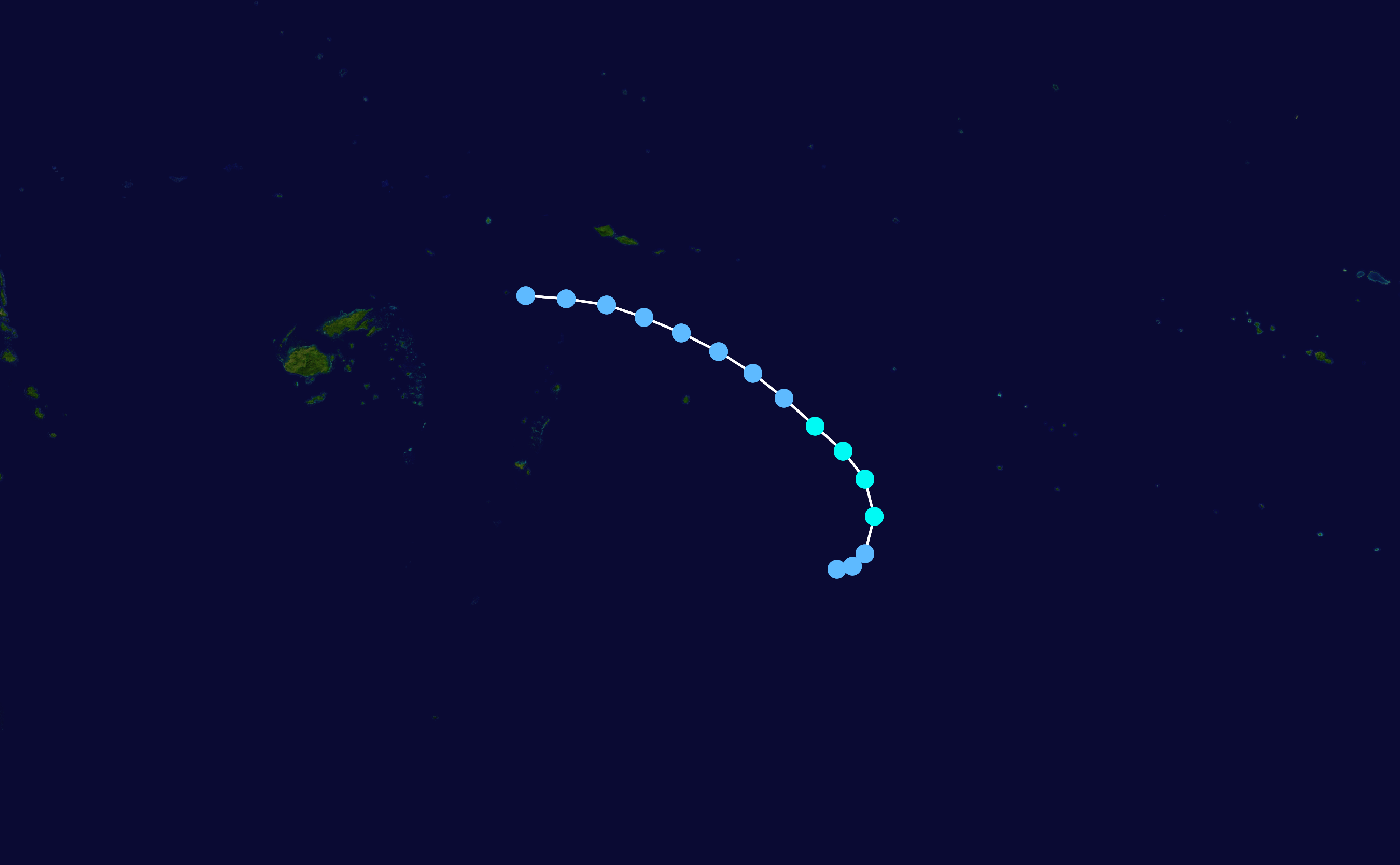
- Duration: January 31 – February 1
- Peak intensity: 75 km/h (45 mph) (10-min); 990 hPa (mbar)

Glenda existed from January 31 to February 1.

=== Tropical Cyclone Henrietta ===
- Category 1 tropical cyclone (Australian scale)
- Tropical storm (SSHWS)
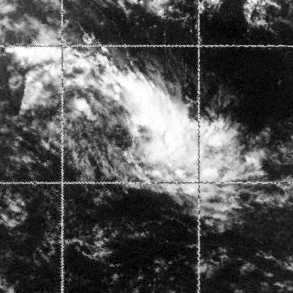
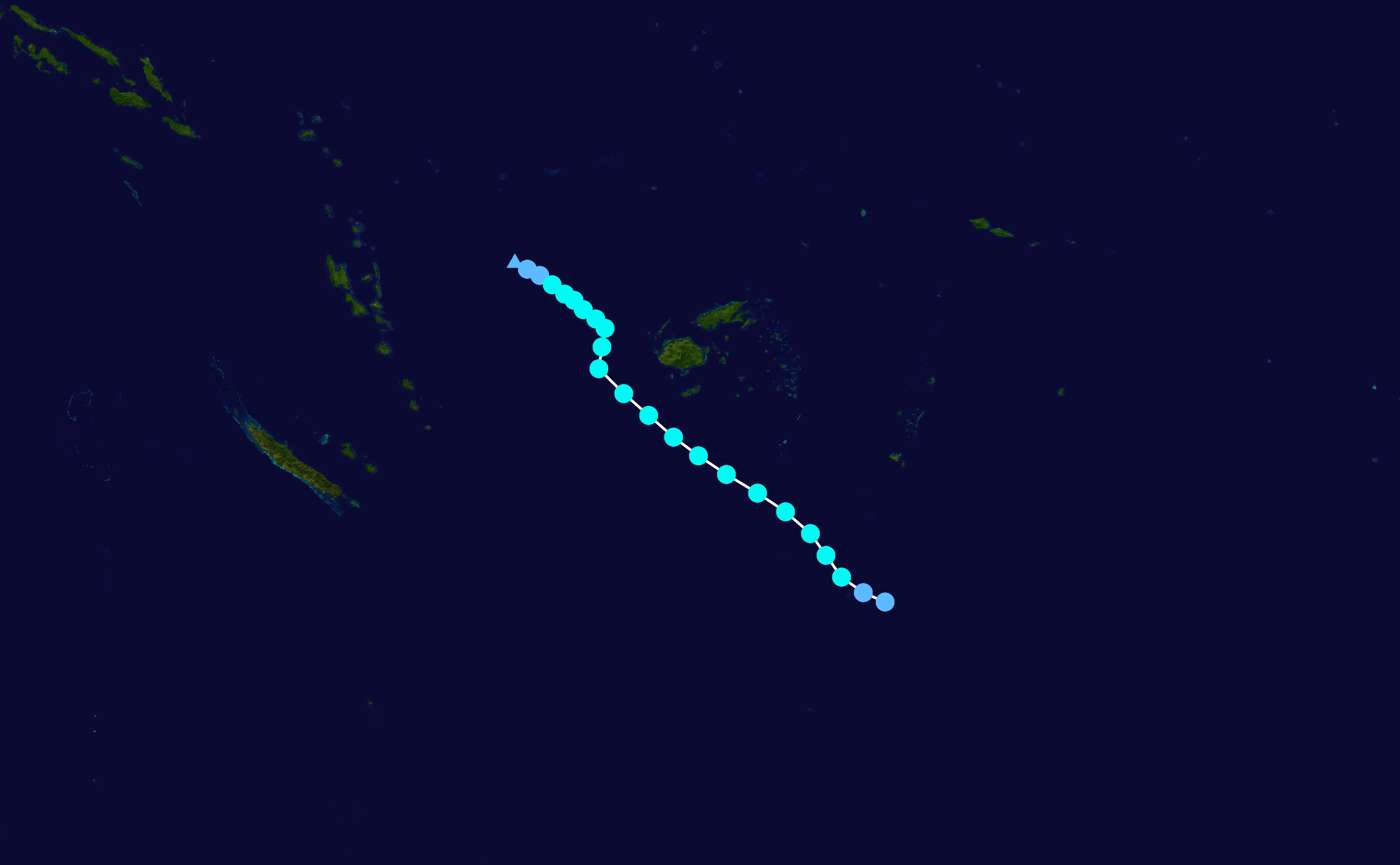
- Duration: February 28 – March 2
- Peak intensity: 75 km/h (45 mph) (10-min); 990 hPa (mbar)

=== Tropical Cyclone Juliette ===
- Category 2 tropical cyclone (Australian scale)
- Tropical storm (SSHWS)
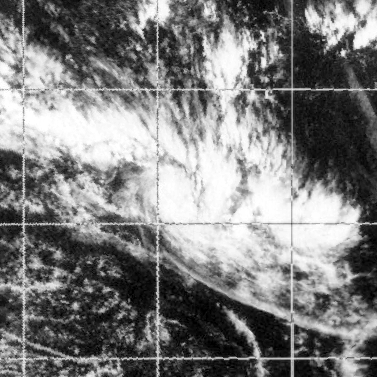
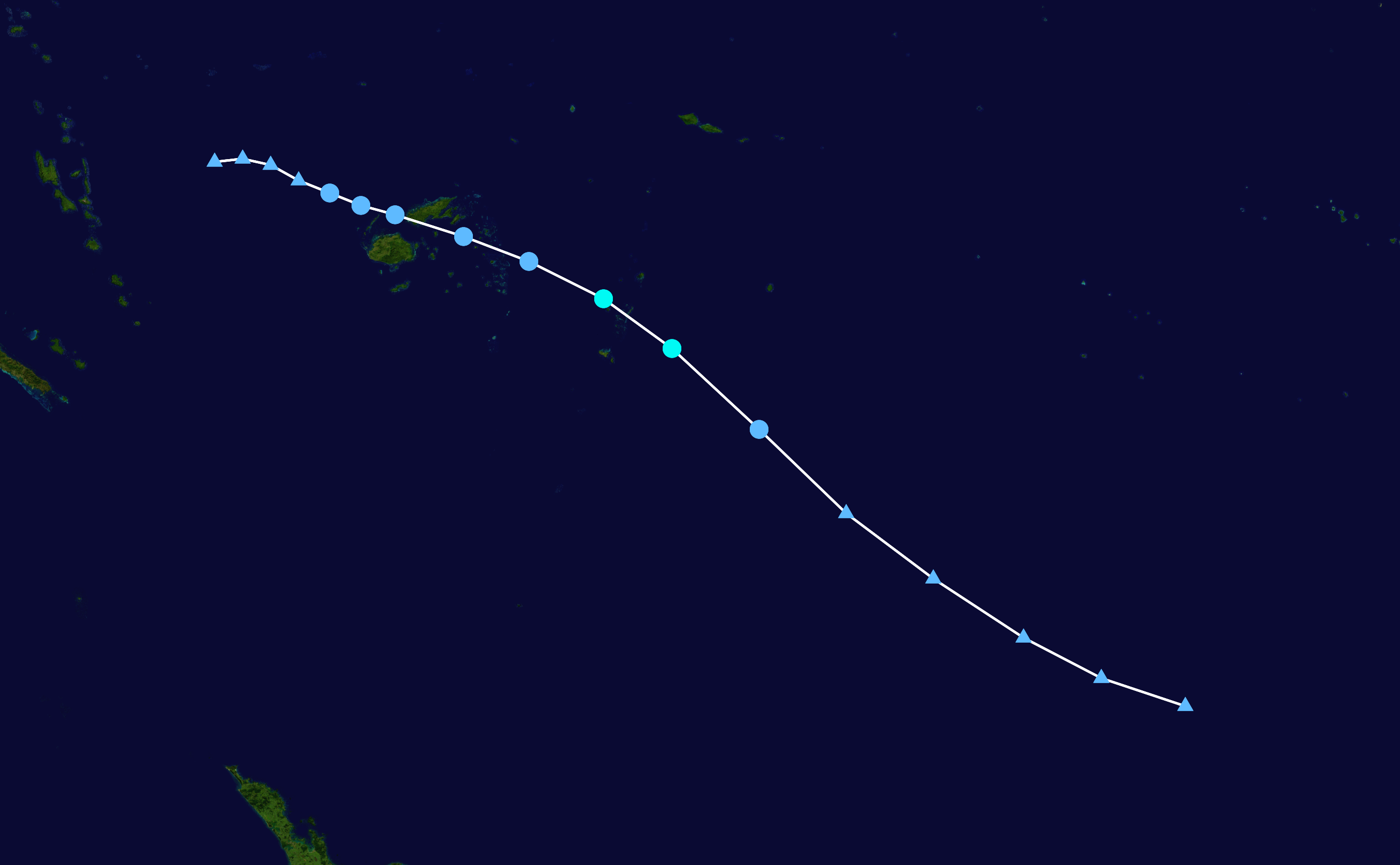
- Duration: April 2 – April 6
- Peak intensity: 100 km/h (65 mph) (10-min); 980 hPa (mbar)

Juliette existed from April 2 to April 6.

== Seasonal effects ==
Name	Dates	Peak intensity			Areas affected	Damage (USD)	Deaths	Ref(s).
Name	Dates	Category	Wind speed	Pressure	Areas affected	Damage (USD)	Deaths	Ref(s).
Bebe	October 19 – 28	Category 3 severe tropical cyclone	155 km/h (100 mph)	945 hPa (27.91 inHg)	Tuvalu, Fiji			
Collette	November 2 – 3	Category 1 tropical cyclone	75 km/h (45 mph)	990 hPa (29.23 inHg)				
Diana	December 8 – 18	Category 3 severe tropical cyclone	130 km/h (80 mph)	965 hPa (28.50 inHg)				
Felicity	January 14 – 18	Category 1 tropical cyclone	75 km/h (45 mph)	990 hPa (29.23 inHg)				
Elenore	January 31 – February 7	Category 2 tropical cyclone	100 km/h (65 mph)	980 hPa (28.94 inHg)	Fiji, Tonga			
Glenda	January 31 – February 1	Category 1 tropical cyclone	75 km/h (45 mph)	990 hPa (29.23 inHg)				
Henrietta	February 28 – March 2	Category 1 tropical cyclone	75 km/h (45 mph)	990 hPa (29.23 inHg)				
Juliette	April 2 – 6	Category 2 tropical cyclone	100 km/h (65 mph)	980 hPa (28.94 inHg)	Fiji, Tonga			
Season aggregates
8 systems	October 19 – April 6		155 km/h (100 mph)	945 hPa (27.91 inHg)				

== See also ==
- Atlantic hurricane seasons: 1972, 1973
- Eastern Pacific hurricane seasons: 1972, 1973
- Western Pacific typhoon seasons: 1972, 1973
- North Indian Ocean cyclone seasons: 1972, 1973
