= 1973 Atlantic hurricane season =

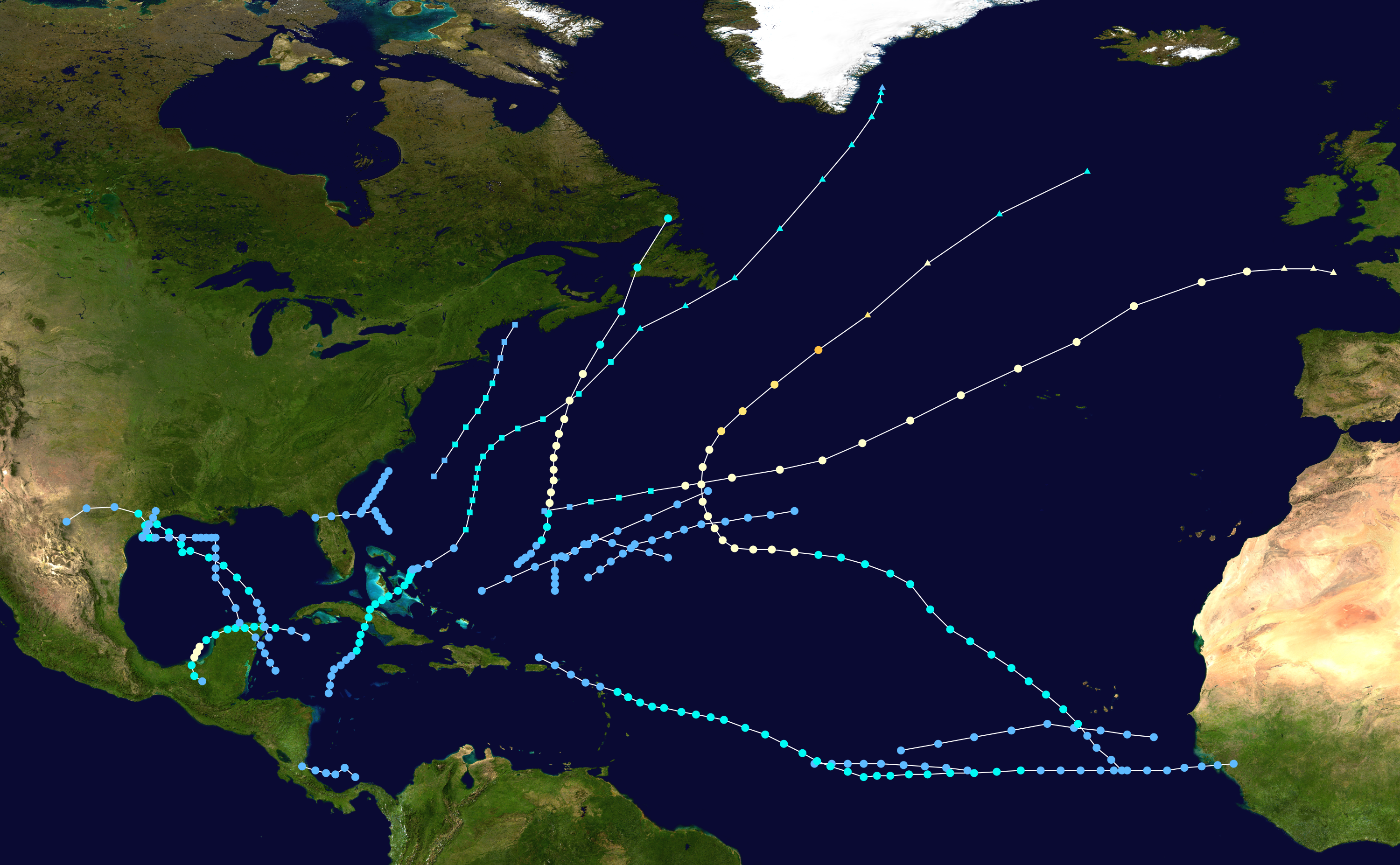
- Season summary map

Seasonal boundaries
- First system formed: April 25, 1973
- Last system dissipated: November 20, 1973

Strongest storm
- Name: Ellen
  - Maximum winds: 115 mph (185 km/h) (1-minute sustained)
  - Lowest pressure: 962 mbar (hPa; 28.41 inHg)

Seasonal statistics
- Total depressions: 14
- Total storms: 12
- Hurricanes: 5
- Major hurricanes (Cat. 3+): 1
- Total fatalities: 22 total
- Total damage: $28 million (1973 USD)

Related articles
- 1973 Pacific hurricane season; 1973 Pacific typhoon season; 1973 North Indian Ocean cyclone season

The 1973 Atlantic hurricane season was a below average tropical cyclone season overall. Of the 14 tropical or subtropical cyclones which developed, 12 became nameable storms, and of those, 5 became hurricanes, with 1 reaching major hurricane status (Category 3 or higher) on the newly implemented Saffir–Simpson hurricane wind scale.

The season officially began on June 1 and ended on November 30. These dates, adopted by convention, historically describe the period in each year when most tropical cyclones form in the North Atlantic. However, the formation of subtropical or tropical cyclones is possible at any time of the year, as demonstrated this season by the formation of multiple pre-season systems, none of which attained storm strength. The first named storm of the year, Hurricane Alice, did not form until July 1.

Two of the season's landfalling storms had severe impacts. In August, Hurricane Brenda struck the eastern coast of the Bay of Campeche, killing 10 people in Campeche, and causing the worst flooding there in decades. Then, early in September, Hurricane Delia hit the northwestern Gulf of Mexico coast, inundating parts of Texas and Louisiana with significant rainfall, which resulted in 5 fatalities and $6 million (1973 USD) in damage. The most intense cyclone of the season was Hurricane Ellen, which reached Category 3 strength during its trek over open water. Also, the season's final named storm, Tropical Storm Gilda, was meteorologically significant in that it became the first documented tropical cyclone on record to transition into a subtropical cyclone after having transitioned to an extratropical cyclone.

== Season summary ==
The first storm of the 1973 hurricane season, forming in late April, developed more than a month before the official start of the season. Several other short-lived, weak depressions formed before and during June; however, none reached storm intensity. The first named storm, Alice, formed on July 1. Tracking generally to the north, Alice also became the first hurricane of the season as well as the first known cyclone to impact Bermuda during July. By the end of July, an unnamed tropical storm formed, which was closely followed by the formation of the season's first subtropical cyclone, given the name Alfa, developing off the east coast of the United States. This storm was short-lived and dissipated on August 2 just offshore southern Maine. The remainder of the first half of August featured no storms. However, later in the month, the season's second hurricane, Brenda, formed in the northwestern Caribbean. Peaking just below Category 2 status on the newly introduced Saffir–Simpson hurricane scale, Brenda made the first recorded landfall in the Mexican State of Campeche.

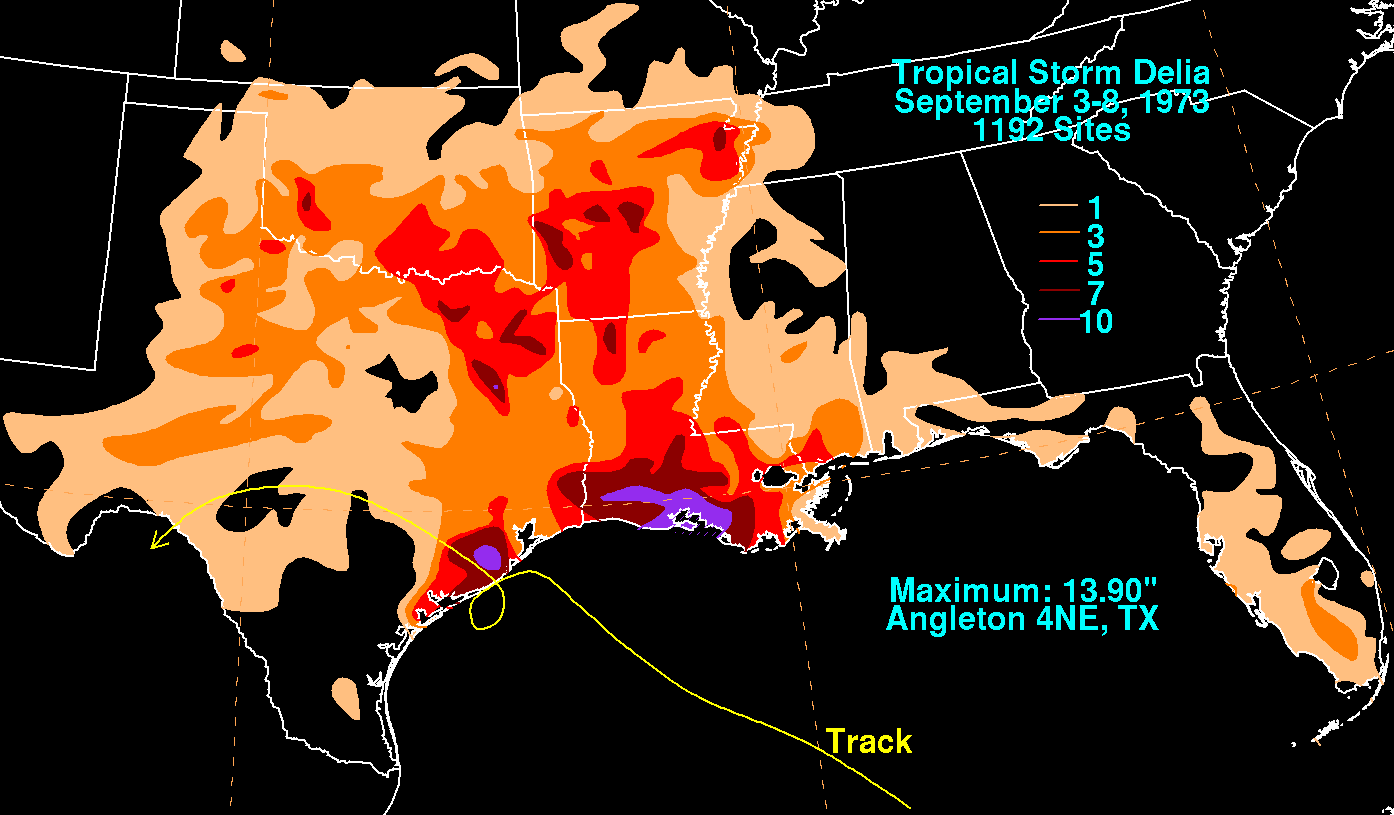
Rainfall from Hurricane Delia in the United States. (Graph does not reflect the upgrade from tropical storm status in the reanalysis)

Later in August, Tropical Storm Christine became the easternmost forming tropical cyclone in the Atlantic basin on record, developing over the western African country of Guinea on August 25. The system traveled for several thousand miles before dissipating in the eastern Caribbean Sea in early September. At the start of the month, Hurricane Delia formed in the Gulf of Mexico, later becoming the first known cyclone to make landfall in the same city twice. After moving inland a second time, Delia eventually dissipated on September 7. As Delia dissipated another depression formed in the same region, eventually making landfall in the same city as Delia, Freeport, Texas. Another unnamed tropical storm formed several days later. On September 13, the strongest storm of the season, Ellen, formed over the eastern Atlantic. After tracking northwest for several days, Ellen eventually attained hurricane status as it turned westward. Several days later, the hurricane turned northeast due to an approaching frontal system. Shortly before becoming extratropical, Ellen reached major hurricane intensity at a record northerly latitude.

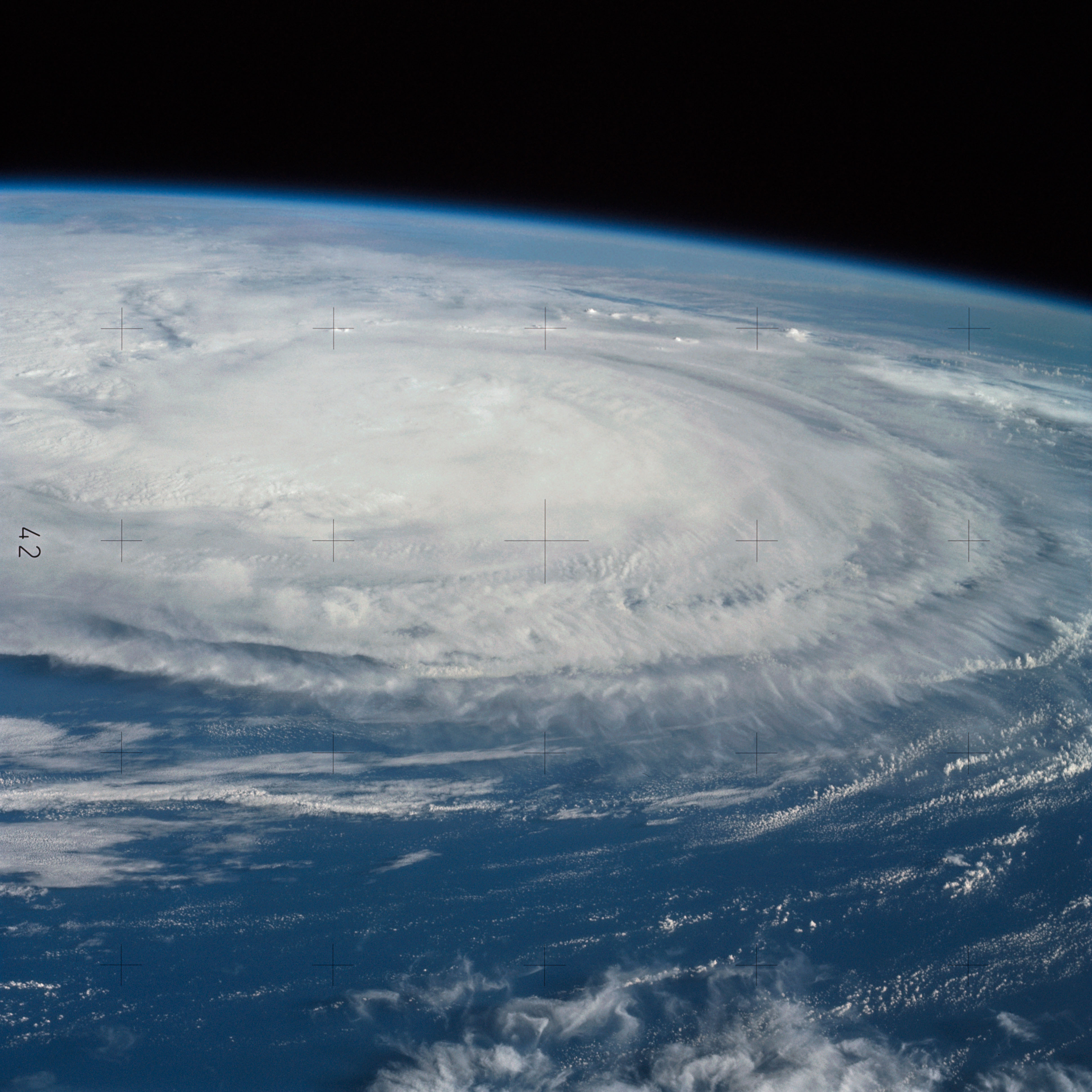
Hurricane Ellen of 1973 was photographed from orbit by astronauts aboard the Skylab space station.

In late September, a brief subtropical depression affected northern Florida before dissipating. After a week of inactivity, two more storms formed: an unnamed tropical storm, and the second subtropical cyclone of the year. The latter of the two, named Bravo, gradually intensified, becoming fully tropical, at which time it was renamed Fran, a few days later. Upon being renamed, Fran had intensified into a hurricane and maintained this intensity for several days before dissipating east of the Azores on October 12. A few days after Fran dissipated, the final named storm of the year formed in the central Caribbean Sea. A slow-moving system, Gilda gradually intensified just below hurricane-intensity before striking Cuba and moving over the Bahamas. A few days after passing through the islands, Gilda became the first storm on record to transition from a tropical cyclone into a subtropical cyclone. A large storm, Gilda eventually became extratropical near Atlantic Canada and dissipated later that month. The final storm of the year developed over the southern Caribbean Sea. This system intensified in a tropical storm and may have briefly moved ashore southern Nicaragua, before continuing to meander over the Caribbean and dissipating on November 20.

== Systems ==
=== Unnumbered subtropical depression ===
- Subtropical depression (SSHWS)
- Duration: April 25 – April 26
- Peak intensity: 30 mph (45 km/h) (1-min); 1010 mbar (hPa)

Based on satellite imagery indicating deep and curved but asymmetrical convection associated with a low-pressure area, a subtropical depression formed on April 25 approximately 190 mi (305 km) north of the Leeward Islands. Moving slowly northeastward, the subtropical depression was soon overcome by strong wind shear, with much of the convection diminishing by the following day. The system degenerated into a remnant low-pressure area at 12:00 UTC on April 26.

=== Hurricane Alice ===
- Category 1 hurricane (SSHWS)
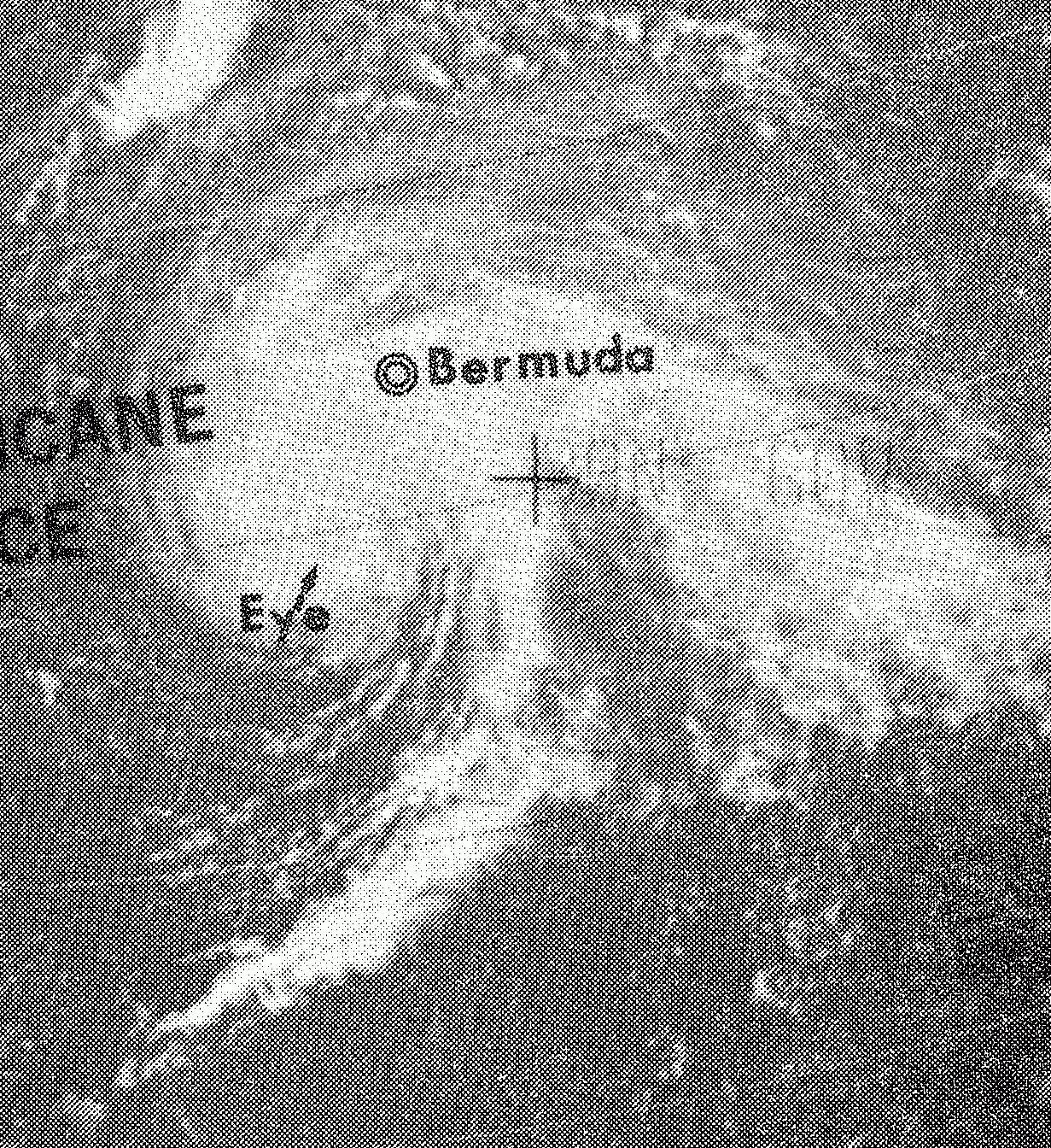
- Duration: July 1 – July 7
- Peak intensity: 85 mph (140 km/h) (1-min); 984 mbar (hPa)

The first named storm formed out of the interaction between tropical wave and a mid-level tropospheric trough northeast of the Bahamas in late-June. A well-defined circulation became apparent by June 30 and satellite images depicted cyclonic banding features. On the following day, the system intensified into a tropical depression. On July 2 it became a tropical storm as reconnaissance aircraft recorded gale-force winds. An area of high pressure to the east of Alice steered the storm generally to the north. Decreasing wind shear allowed the storm to become increasingly organized and an evident eye developed by July 3. By this time, reconnaissance had determined that the storm had intensified into a hurricane, but a 2026 reanalysis found that Alice remained a strong tropical storm until a day later.

On July 4, the storm reached its peak intensity with winds of 85 mph (137 km/h) and a barometric pressure of 984 mbar (hPa; 29.06 inHg), as the eastern portion of the eyewall brushed Bermuda. Alice was then a compact storm, with a smaller-than-usual eye diameter and elevated ambient pressures. At the time, Alice was regarded as the first July tropical cyclone to closely bypass Bermuda. After passing the island, Alice began to accelerate in response to a mid-level trough over the eastern United States and weakened. By July 6, winds head decreased below hurricane intensity as the storm neared Atlantic Canada. Later that day, Alice made landfall in western Newfoundland with winds of 60 mph (95 km/h), before transitioning into an extratropical cyclone.

During its passage of Bermuda, Alice produced sustained winds up to 75 mph (120 km/h) and gusts to 87 mph (140 km/h). The winds blew down a few trees and powerlines. The heavy rainfall, peaking at 4.57 in (116 mm), ended a three-month drought in Bermuda. Although Alice tracked through Atlantic Canada, no impact was recorded.

=== Unnamed July tropical storm ===
- Tropical storm (SSHWS)
- Duration: July 23 – July 25
- Peak intensity: 45 mph (75 km/h) (1-min); 1007 mbar (hPa)

On July 23, satellite and station data confirmed a closed low-pressure area over the Gulf of Honduras. The system quickly became a tropical storm, as shown by several reports of gales. After peaking with winds of 45 mph (75 km/h), the storm struck southern British Honduras (Note: Now Belize) a day later with the same winds. By July 25 the cyclone ended over southeastern Mexico.

=== Subtropical Storm Alfa ===
- Subtropical storm (SSHWS)
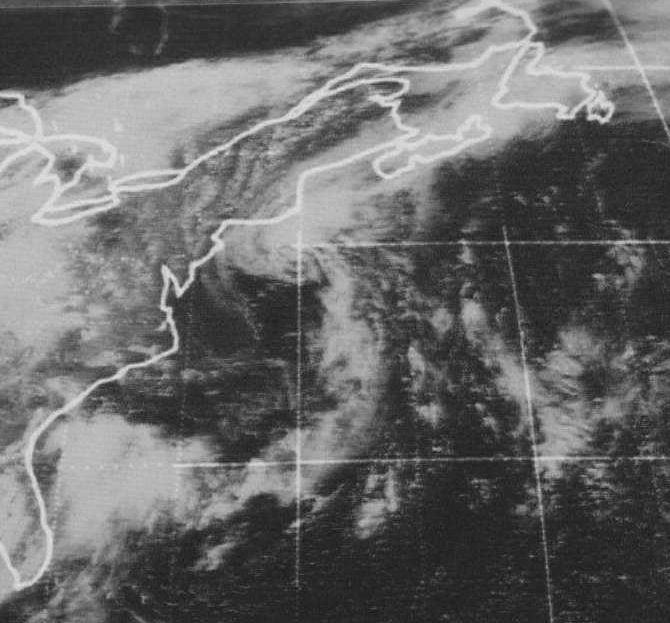
- Duration: July 30 – August 2
- Peak intensity: 45 mph (75 km/h) (1-min); 1005 mbar (hPa)

During late July, an upper-level low, with a non-tropical cold core, formed near Cape Hatteras, North Carolina and tracked southward. Gradually, the circulation lowered to the surface and developed subtropical characteristics. On July 31, the system attained gale-force winds off the Mid-Atlantic coast and was named Alfa, the first name from the list of subtropical storm names for the 1973 season. Tracking north-northeast, the system intensified very little as it paralleled the coastline. By August 1, the system weakened below subtropical storm intensity as it neared New England. The following day, Alfa dissipated just off the southern coast of Maine. The only effects from Alfa was light to moderate rainfall in New England, peaking at 5.03 in (128 mm) in Turners Falls, Massachusetts. Most of southern Maine recorded around 1 in (25 mm), with a maximum of 2.59 in (66 mm) in Saco.

=== Hurricane Brenda ===
- Category 1 hurricane (SSHWS)
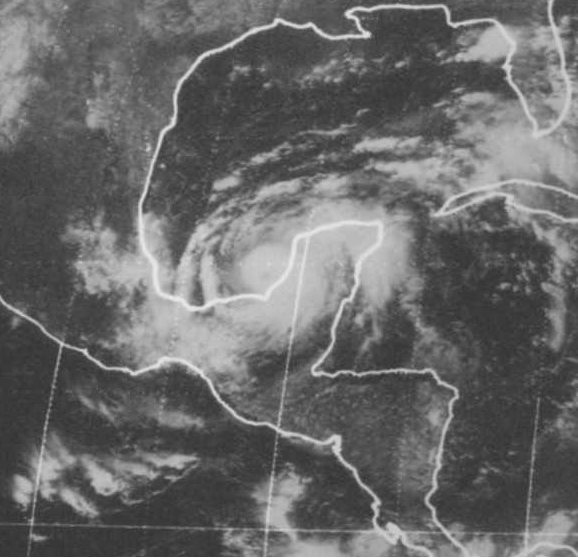
- Duration: August 18 – August 22
- Peak intensity: 90 mph (150 km/h) (1-min); 977 mbar (hPa)

Hurricane Brenda originated from a tropical wave that moved off the western coast of Africa on August 9; however, the initial wave quickly weakened upon entering the Atlantic Ocean. By August 13, the wave began to regenerate as it passed through the Lesser Antilles. Several days later, convection associated with the system consolidated into a central, organized mass and on August 18, the system had become sufficiently organized to be declared a tropical depression while situated near the Yucatán Channel. Early the next day, the depression strengthened into Tropical Storm Brenda as it made landfall in the northern portion of the Yucatán Peninsula. After moving inland, a strong ridge of high pressure over Texas forced the storm to take an unusual track, eventually leading it to enter the Bay of Campeche on August 20.

Once back over water, Brenda began to intensify, attaining hurricane status late on August 20. The next day, a well-defined eye had developed and the storm attained its peak intensity as a high-end Category 1 hurricane with winds of 90 mph (150 km/h) and a minimum pressure of 977 mbar (hPa; 28.85 inHg). It is possible that Brenda reached Category 2 intensity, but the data is inconclusive to support such. The storm made landfall later that day near Ciudad del Carmen, Mexico at this intensity, becoming the first hurricane on record to strike the region. After moving inland, Brenda rapidly weakened to a depression by the morning of August 22 and dissipated later that day.

Already suffering from severe flooding that killed at least 18 people and left 200,000 homeless, Hurricane Brenda worsened the situation with torrential rainfall and additional flooding. The storm killed at least 10 people in the country. Following the damage wrought by Brenda, a large earthquake struck the region, hampering relief efforts and collapsing numerous structures. Winds on land gusted up to 112 mph (180 km/h), leading to severe wind damage. Two of the fatalities occurred in Campeche after 80% of the city was flooded. This was considered the worst flooding in the city in over 25 years. An estimated 2,000 people were left homeless as a direct result of Brenda throughout Mexico. Offshore, a freighter with 25 crewman became trapped in the storm after its engines failed. They were safely rescued several days later once the storm had dissipated.

=== Tropical Storm Christine ===
- Tropical storm (SSHWS)
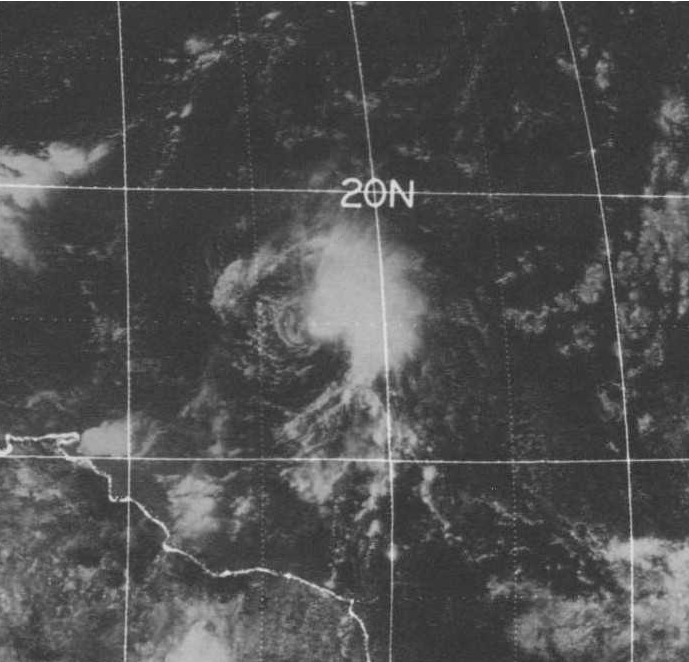
- Duration: August 26 – September 4
- Peak intensity: 60 mph (95 km/h) (1-min); 999 mbar (hPa)

Tropical Storm Christine originated from a tropical wave over Africa in mid-August. As it neared the Atlantic Ocean, the wave organized into a tropical depression shortly after emerging from Guinea at 16.4°W. It steadily tracked west across the Atlantic, and attained tropical storm intensity on August 28. Despite the lack of aircraft reconnaissance in the region, the intensity was determined by wind readings from a German cargo ship that passed through the storm. On August 30, the first reconnaissance mission into the storm found tropical storm-force winds and the first advisory was issued that day, immediately declaring the system as Tropical Storm Christine. Three days later, Christine attained its peak intensity, with winds of 60 mph (97 km/h) and a minimum pressure of 999 mbar (hPa; 29.50 inHg). Shortly thereafter, increasing wind shear caused the storm to weaken as it neared the Leeward Islands. As it passed over Antigua on September 3, Christine weakened to a tropical depression and eventually dissipated near the Dominican Republic later that day.

During its passage through the Leeward Islands, Christine produced torrential rainfall, peaking at 11.74 in (298 mm) in southeastern Puerto Rico. These rains led to flooding on several islands. One person was killed during the storm after being electrocuted by a downed power line on a flooded road. Schools were closed ahead of the storm in Puerto Rico and the United States Virgin Islands as a precaution following the issuance of flood warnings. Six scientists had to be evacuated from the small island of Aves once the storm posed a threat to them. No major damage was reported on any of the affected islands in the wake of Christine.

=== Hurricane Delia ===
- Category 1 hurricane (SSHWS)
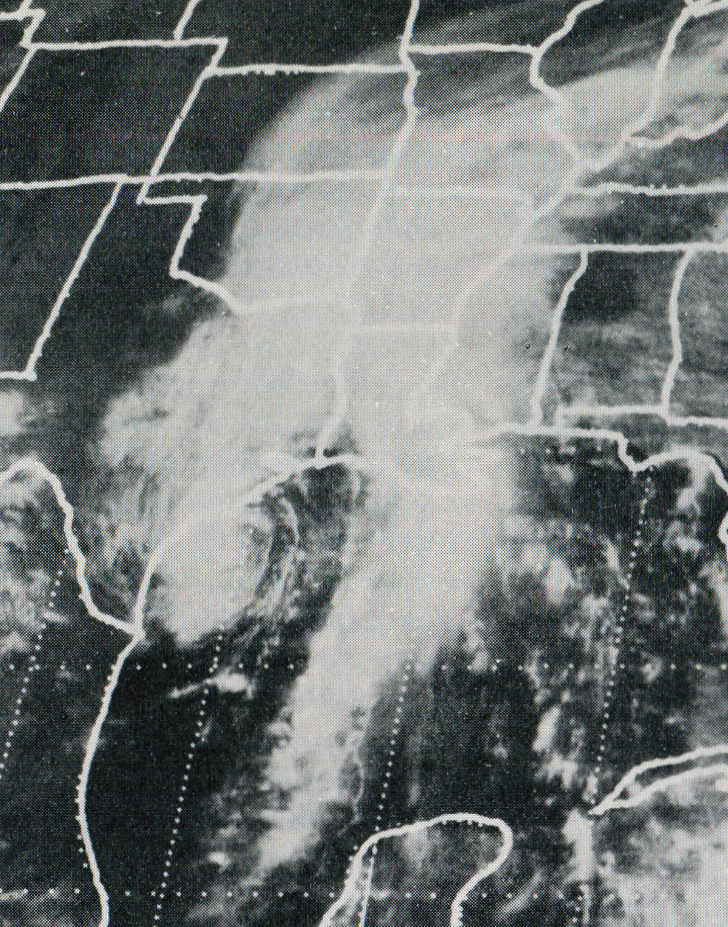
- Duration: September 1 – September 7
- Peak intensity: 85 mph (140 km/h) (1-min); 986 mbar (hPa)

On August 27, a tropical wave formed over the central Caribbean and tracked towards the west-northwest. The system gradually developed organized shower and thunderstorm activity. By September 1, a tropical depression developed from the wave. By September 3, the depression had intensified into a tropical storm, receiving the name Delia, and began tracking more towards the west. A complex steering pattern began to take place later on that day, resulting in the creation of a more hostile environment for tropical cyclones in the Gulf of Mexico. As Delia neared the Texas coastline, it managed to intensify into a Category 1 hurricane with winds of 85 mph (140 km/h). The lowest pressure was recorded at 986 mbar (hPa; 29.12 inHg) at this time. Shortly thereafter, the cyclone made its first landfall in Freeport, Texas late on September 4 just after weakening to tropical storm intensity. After executing a counterclockwise loop, the storm made landfall in Freeport again on September 5. After moving inland, the storm quickly weakened, becoming a depression on September 6 before dissipating early the next day over northern Mexico.

Due to the erratic track of the storm along the Texas coastline, widespread heavy rains fell in areas near the storm and in Louisiana. Tides up to 6 ft (1.8 m), in addition to rainfall up to 13.9 in (350 mm), caused significant flooding in the Galveston-Freeport area. Up to $3 million was reported in damages to homes due to the flooding. Throughout Louisiana, there was substantial flooding of farmland. Damages to crops amounted to $3 million. In addition to the flooding rains produced by Delia, eight tornadoes also touched down due to the storm, injuring four people. Five people were killed during Delia, two drowned during floods, two died in a car accident and the other died from a heart attack while boarding up his home.

=== Tropical Storm Eleven ===
- Tropical storm (SSHWS)
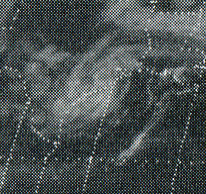
- Duration: September 10 – September 13
- Peak intensity: 40 mph (65 km/h) (1-min); 1001 mbar (hPa)

On September 6, a tropical depression formed over the northwestern Caribbean Sea within a trough of low pressure extended southeastward from Delia, which was situated over southeast Texas at the time. The depression remained weak until it reached the Texas coastline on September 10. Once onshore, it produced significant rainfall, causing significant damage that was attributed to Tropical Storm Delia. After turning northeast and tracking inland, the depression quickly increased in forward speed before dissipating over North Carolina on September 14.

Along the coasts of Texas and Louisiana, the depression produced significant amounts of rainfall, peaking at 11.15 in (283 mm) near Freeport. Several areas in southern Louisiana recorded rainfall exceeding 5 in (130 mm) with a maximum amount of 9.2 in (230 mm) falling in Kinder. Significant rainfall was also recorded in the Carolinas and Georgia, with numerous areas recording over 3 in (76 mm). A maximum of 9.35 in (237 mm) fell near Whitmire, South Carolina before the system dissipated. In all, the depression resulted in an additional $22 million in crop losses in southern Louisiana.

=== Hurricane Ellen ===
- Category 3 hurricane (SSHWS)
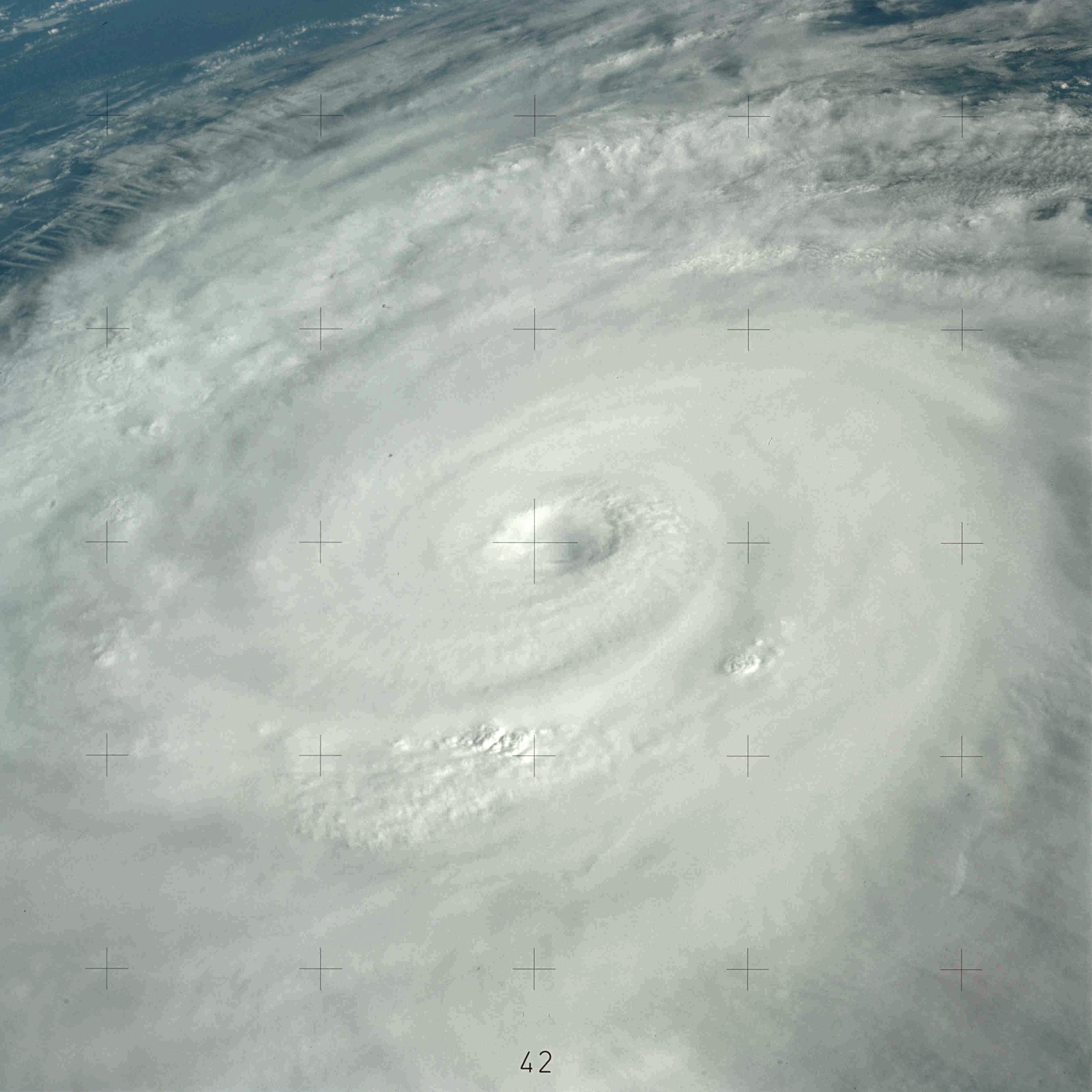
- Duration: September 14 – September 22
- Peak intensity: 115 mph (185 km/h) (1-min); 962 mbar (hPa)

The strongest storm of the season, Hurricane Ellen, began as a tropical wave that moved off the western coast of Africa on September 13. On the following day, the wave spawned an area of low pressure south of the Cape Verde Islands that quickly became a tropical depression. Tracking northeast, the system intensified into a tropical storm on September 15 after sustained winds of 45 mph (75 km/h) were reported by a French naval vessel; however, due to sparse data on the storm, the first advisory on Ellen was not issued for two more days. A slightly elongated storm, Ellen gradually intensified over the open Atlantic and was steered by two troughs of low pressure. On September 18, the storm took a nearly due west track and the system became increasingly organized, with an ill-defined eye becoming present on satellite imagery.

The next day, Ellen intensified into a hurricane before taking a sharp turn to the north-northwest in response to a weak trough moving northeast from the Bahamas. Gradually, the hurricane turned more towards the northeast and began to accelerate as well as intensify. Despite being at an unusually high latitude for development, the storm underwent a brief period of rapid intensification, strengthening into a Category 3 hurricane on September 21. At that time, Ellen attained its peak intensity with winds of 115 mph (185 km/h) and a minimum pressure of 962 mbar (hPa; 28.41 inHg). Shortly after peaking, Ellen slowly weakened as it reached the northern wall of the Gulf Stream, and later transitioned into an extratropical cyclone before merging with a frontal system several hundred miles east of Newfoundland on September 23.

=== Subtropical Depression Thirteen ===
- Subtropical depression (SSHWS)
- Duration: September 24 – September 26
- Peak intensity: 30 mph (45 km/h) (1-min); 1010 mbar (hPa)

On September 24, a depression formed northeast of the Bahamas. The following day, the NHC issued their first advisory on the system, declaring it a subtropical depression. The depression was displayed an asymmetrical structure, with most winds being recorded up to 300 mi (480 km) north of the center. Later that day, the NHC issued small craft advisories for coastal areas between North Carolina and St. Augustine, Florida. Tracking north-northwestward in response to a break in a subtropical ridge to the north, the depression eventually made landfall near Marineland, Florida and quickly weakened, dissipating before reaching the Gulf of Mexico.

Heavy rain fell in association with the depression in parts of Florida and Georgia. A maximum of 6.74 in (171 mm) fell in Orlando while several other areas recorded over 3 in (76 mm) of rain. Over land, wind gusts reached 40 mph (65 km/h) in some locations. Offshore, swells produced by the system reached 10 ft (3.0 m), impacting several vessels in the region. Minor beach erosion and coastal flooding was reported in parts of South Carolina as a result of the storm. In parts of coastal Georgia, high water resulted in several road closures and flooded a few homes. Police officers in Savannah reported that wave were topping the local seawall; however, no damage was reported.

=== Unnamed October tropical storm ===
- Tropical storm (SSHWS)
- Duration: October 6 – October 10
- Peak intensity: 65 mph (100 km/h) (1-min); 1006 mbar (hPa)

A subtropical depression was first marked about 50 mi (80 km) west-southwest of Faial Island early on October 6. Moving east, it passed the Azores, becoming a tropical storm the following day. It dissipated about 340 mi (550 km) east-northeast of São Miguel Island on October 10.

=== Hurricane Fran (Bravo) ===
- Category 1 hurricane (SSHWS)
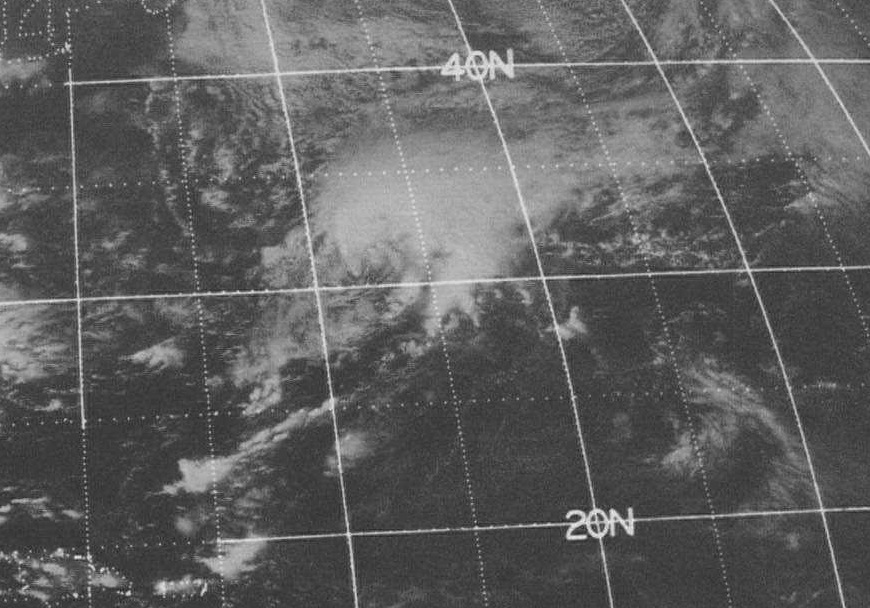
- Duration: October 8 – October 12
- Peak intensity: 85 mph (140 km/h) (1-min); 986 mbar (hPa)

Hurricane Fran originated from a tropical wave associated with an area of convection north of Hispaniola on October 1. By October 4, the system interacted with a mid-tropospheric trough near the southeast United States, resulting in the formation of a surface low. Tracking eastward, showers and thunderstorms began to develop around the circulation; however, the structure of the system was not fully tropical. On October 7, ships in the vicinity of the low reported decreasing barometric pressures, indicating a strengthening system. Satellites monitoring the system depicted a disorganized storm with mainly subtropical characteristics, affected by cooler air from a cold front. Late on October 8, the cyclone had become sufficiently organized to be classified a subtropical depression, and a day later the system was upgraded to Subtropical Storm Bravo. By October 10, Bravo had intensified substantially, as hurricane hunters recorded hurricane-force winds roughly 15 mi (25 km) from the center of the storm. Following this finding, the National Hurricane Center reclassified the system as Hurricane Fran, dropping its previous designation of Bravo. Upon becoming tropical, Fran developed a strong outflow and several convective feeder bands. Additionally, the storm had developed a 35 mi (55 km) wide eye. Steered quickly eastward by a deep surface low in the westerlies, Fran accelerated towards the Azores Islands. By October 11, the hurricane began to undergo an extratropical transition, and around that time, Fran attained its peak winds of 85 mph (135 km/h). Shortly after bypassing the Azores islands on October 12, the system moved over an area with sea surface temperatures around 60 °F (16 °C), well below what is required for tropical cyclone development. Later that day, the central pressure of Fran decreased to 978 mbar (hPa; 28.88 inHg), the lowest recorded in relation to the hurricane. Around the time of reaching this intensity, the hurricane transitioned into an extratropical cyclone and quickly merged with a cold front off the coast of France.

Although Fran passed near the Azores as a hurricane, winds on the islands only reached 45 mph (70 km/h). On October 12, a French ship encountered the storm, recording sustained winds of 40 mph (65 km/h) and an air pressure of 981 mbar (hPa; 28.97 inHg). Ships near the English and French coastlines recorded winds up to 60 mph (95 km/h) as the extratropical remnants of Fran passed through the region.

=== Tropical Storm Gilda ===
- Tropical storm (SSHWS)
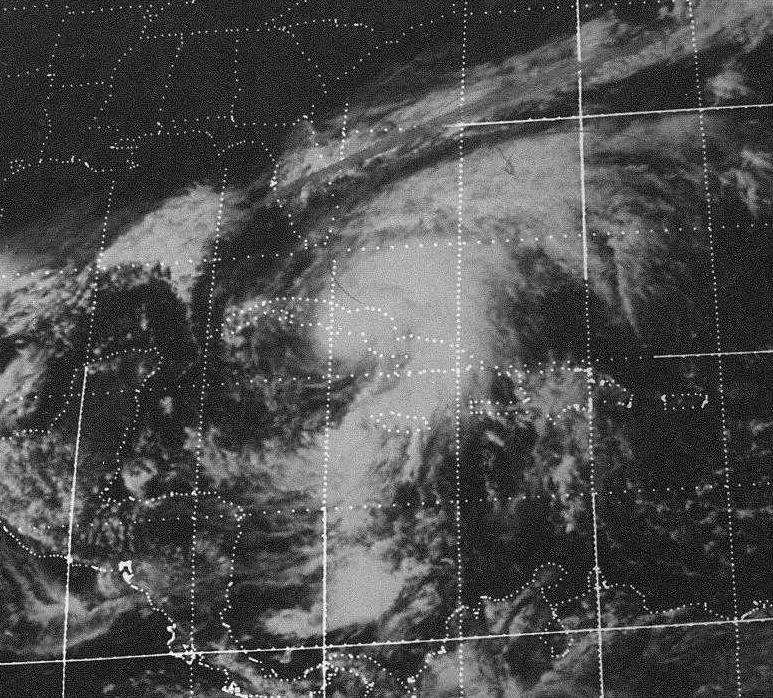
- Duration: October 16 – October 27
- Peak intensity: 70 mph (110 km/h) (1-min); 984 mbar (hPa)

The precursor to Tropical Storm Gilda was a large convective system partially due to a tropical wave. It gradually became better organized over the northwestern Caribbean Sea, and on October 15, a tropical depression formed off the coast of Nicaragua. As it drifted to the northeast, it strengthened to a tropical storm, peaking at 70 mph (110 km/h) winds. Before it hit the coast of Cuba, it weakened enough to cause only minor damage. By the time it struck the island, it had become very disorganized in nature.

On October 24, cool, dry air entered the newly developed convection, and as a result it transitioned into a subtropical cyclone. Gilda became the first tropical system to pass through a subtropical stage prior to becoming extratropical. The large circulation continued northeast before becoming extratropical on October 27. The remnants of Gilda intensified as they tracked near Atlantic Canada, attaining a central pressure of 968 mbar (hPa; 28.59 inHg) near Cape Race, Newfoundland. The system eventually dissipated near southern Greenland on October 29.

Gilda caused heavy rain and mudslides in Jamaica, destroying six homes and killing six people. In Cuba, Gilda dropped over 6 in (150 mm) of rain, while 60 mph (95 km/h) winds were reported in the northern part of the country. In the Bahamas, Gilda caused significant crop damage from heavy rainfall and high tides. The storm's persistent strong currents and easterly winds caused moderate beach erosion on the East Coast of the United States, mostly along the Florida coast. The extratropical remnants of the storm produced hurricane-force wind gusts over parts of Atlantic Canada, peaking at 75 mph (120 km/h); however, no damage was reported.

=== Unnamed November tropical storm ===
- Tropical storm (SSHWS)
- Duration: November 17 – November 20
- Peak intensity: 40 mph (65 km/h) (1-min); 1006 mbar (hPa)

The final system of the year, Tropical Storm Seventeen, formed near the northern coast of Panama on November 17 as a tropical depression. After intensifying into a tropical storm early the next day, the cyclone passed near or possibly briefly over the southern Nicaragua on November 19. The system then continued to meander over the southwestern Caribbean until dissipating on November 20.

=== Other systems ===
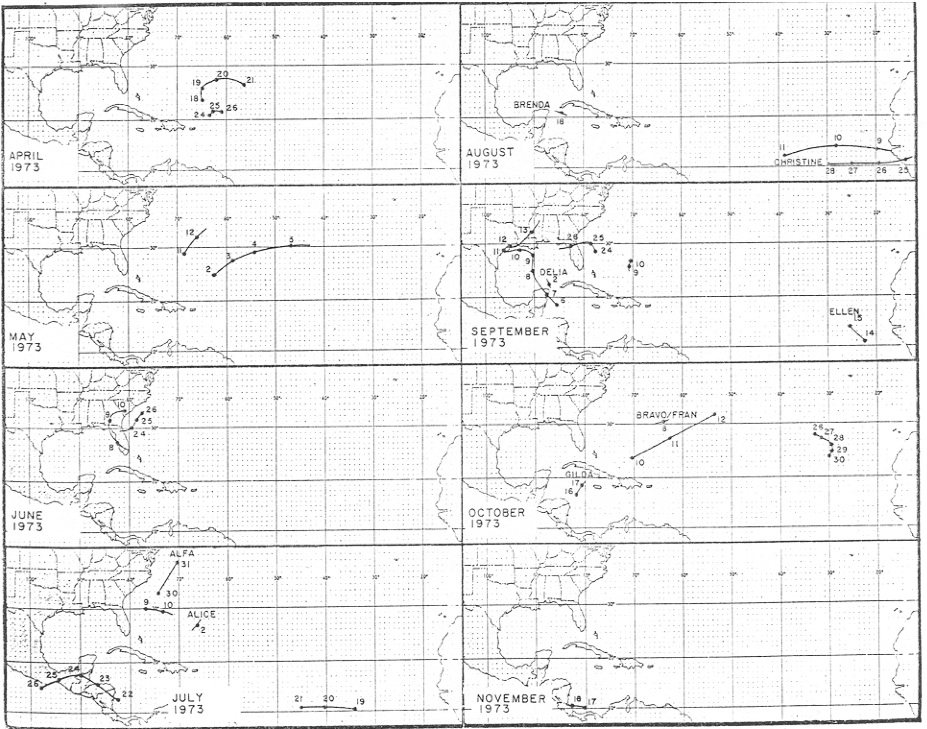
Tracks of all depressions during 1973, prior to a 2026 reassessment by the Atlantic hurricane reanalysis project

The National Hurricane Center previously classified several other storm systems as tropical depressions in the Atlantic during that year, but a 2026 re-examination of the season by Atlantic hurricane reanalysis project led to their deletion from the official hurricane database (HURDAT). Two of these formerly classified systems existed in the pre-season, AL011973 and AL021973, the former from April 18 to April 21 and the latter from May 2 to May 5. Other tropical depressions removed from HURDAT during the 2026 re-analysis included AL031973, AL051973, and AL071973, which were believed to have existed from June 24 to June 26, July 19 to July 21, and August 9 to August 11, respectively.

The annual summary of the 1973 Atlantic hurricane season, published in 1974 in the Monthly Weather Review (MWR), also lists tropical depressions from May 11 to May 12, June 7 to June 10, July 9 to July 10, July 22 to July 26, September 8 to September 10, October 10 to October 12, and October 26 to October 30. However, none of these systems are included in HURDAT either. The late July system contributed to the development of Hurricane Florence in the eastern Pacific Ocean.

The June tropical depression listed in the MWR caused flooding in Georgia's Savannah area and parts of South Carolina. In the former, at least 100 residents of low-lying areas fled their homes due to flooding from heavy rains and abnormally high tides. Charleston County, South Carolina, observed about 9 in (230 mm) of precipitation in a 13-hour period on June 11. Consequently, 45 families from North Charleston evacuated and floodwaters covered about 70% of roads in the county. Farther inland, flooding caused streets to be closed and cars to stall in Sumter.

== Storm names ==
The following list of names was used for named tropical storms that formed in the north Atlantic in 1973. Storms were named Christine, Delia, Ellen and Fran for the first time in 1973. No names were retired following the season; however, an overhaul of the naming system in 1979 to include male names resulted in this list being discarded.

- Alice
- Brenda
- Christine
- Delia
- Ellen
- Fran
- Gilda
- Helen (unused)
- Imogene (unused)
- Joy (unused)
- Kate (unused)
- Loretta (unused)
- Madge (unused)
- Nancy (unused)
- Ona (unused)
- Patsy (unused)
- Rose (unused)
- Sally (unused)
- Tam (unused)
- Vera (unused)
- Wilda (unused)

The NATO phonetic alphabet (below) was used to designates subtropical cyclones that formed in the north Atlantic in 1973. Subtropical Storm Bravo became Fran after acquiring tropical characteristics.

- Alfa
- Bravo
- Charlie (unused)
- Delta (unused)
- Echo (unused)
- Foxtrot (unused)
- Golf (unused)
- Hotel (unused)
- India (unused)
- Juliett (unused)
- Kilo (unused)
- Lima (unused)
- Mike (unused)
- November (unused)
- Oscar (unused)
- Papa (unused)
- Quebec (unused)
- Romeo (unused)
- Sierra (unused)
- Tango (unused)
- Uniform (unused)
- Victor (unused)
- Whiskey (unused)
- Xray (unused)
- Yankee (unused)
- Zulu (unused)

== Season effects ==
This is a table of all of the storms that formed in the 1973 Atlantic hurricane season. It includes their name, duration, peak classification and intensities, areas affected, damage, and death totals. Deaths in parentheses are additional and indirect (an example of an indirect death would be a traffic accident), but were still related to that storm. Damage and deaths include totals while the storm was extratropical, a wave, or a low, and all of the damage figures are in 1973 USD.

Saffir–Simpson scale
TD	TS	C1	C2	C3	C4	C5

1973 North Atlantic tropical cyclone season statistics
Storm name	Dates active	Storm category at peak intensity	Max 1-min wind mph (km/h)	Min. press. (mbar)	Areas affected	Damage (US$)	Deaths	Ref(s).
Unnumbered	April 25–26	Subtropical depression	35 (55)	1006	None	None	None	
Alice	July 1–7	Category 1 hurricane	85 (140)	984	Bermuda, Newfoundland	Minimal	None	
Unnamed	July 23–25	Tropical storm	45 (75)	1007	Yucatán Peninsula	None	None	
Alfa	July 30 – August 2	Subtropical storm	45 (75)	1005	New England	None	None	
Brenda	August 18–22	Category 1 hurricane	90 (150)	977	Yucatan Peninsula	Unknown	10 (0)	
Christine	August 26 – September 4	Tropical storm	60 (95)	999	Leeward Islands	Unknown	0 (1)	
Delia	September 1–7	Category 1 hurricane	85 (140)	986	Northeastern Mexico, Texas	$6 million	2 (3)	
Eleven	September 10–13	Tropical storm	40 (65)	1001	Yucatan Peninsula, Southern United States	$22 million	None	
Ellen	September 14–22	Category 3 hurricane	115 (185)	962	None	None	None	
Thirteen	September 24–26	Subtropical depression	35 (55)	1009	Florida	None	None	
Unnamed	October 6–10	Tropical storm	65 (100)	1006	Azores	None	None	
Fran (Bravo)	October 8–12	Category 1 hurricane	85 (140)	986	None	None	None	
Gilda	October 16–27	Tropical storm	70 (110)	984	Cuba, Bahamas	Unknown	6 (0)	
Seventeen	November 17–20	Tropical storm	40 (65)	1006	Costa Rica	Unknown	None	
Season aggregates
14 systems	April 25 – November 20		115 (185)	962		$28 million	18 (4)	

== See also ==
- 1973 Pacific hurricane season
- 1973 Pacific typhoon season
- 1973 North Indian Ocean cyclone season
- Australian cyclone seasons: 1972–73, 1973–74
- South Pacific cyclone seasons: 1972–73, 1973–74
- South-West Indian Ocean cyclone seasons: 1972–73, 1973–74
- South Atlantic tropical cyclone
- Mediterranean tropical-like cyclone
