= 1972 hurricane season =

1972 hurricane season may refer to:

- The 1972 Atlantic hurricane season
- The 1972 Pacific hurricane season
