= Hurricane Fico =

Category 4 Pacific hurricane in 1978

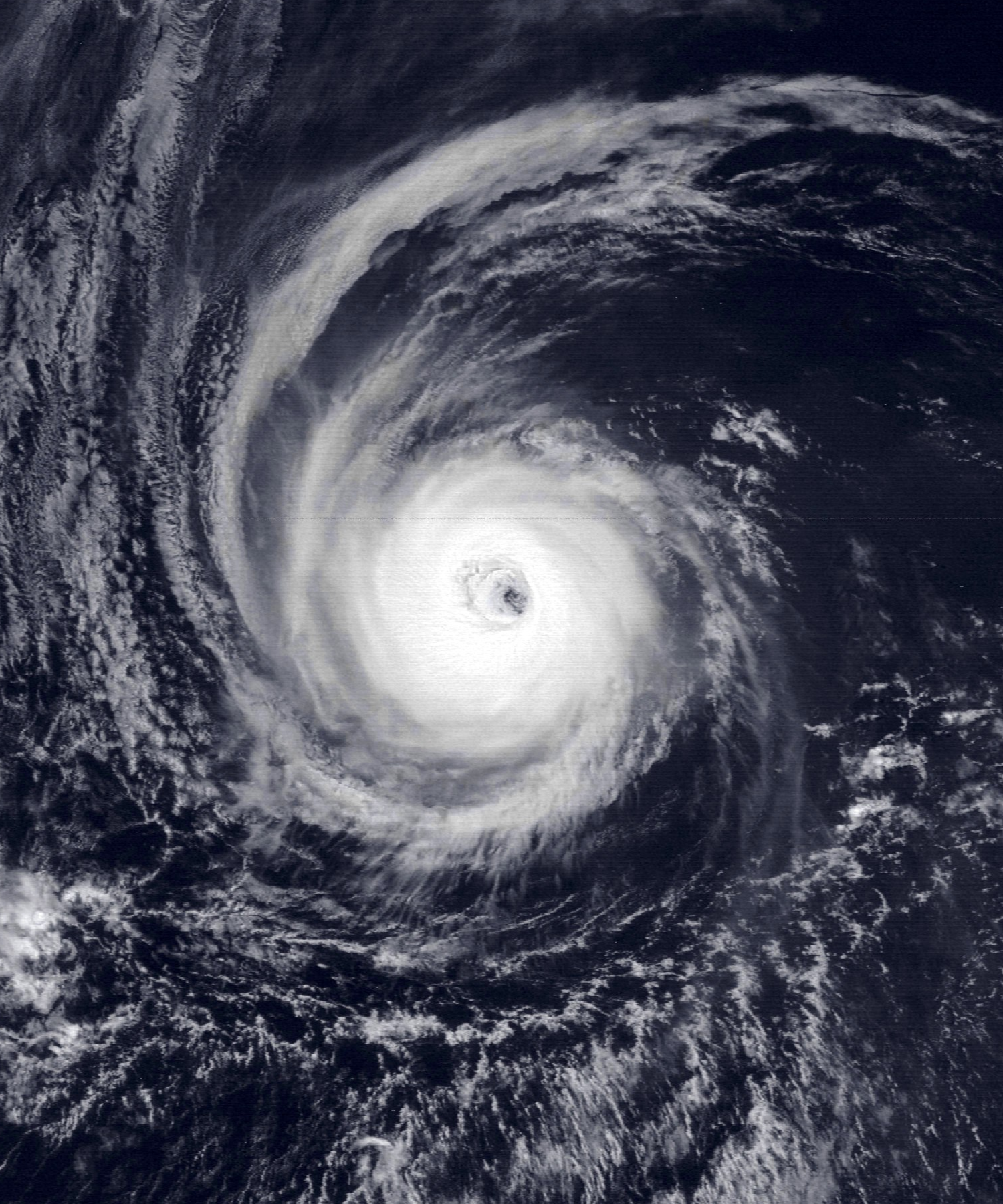
- Fico at its secondary peak intensity on July 14

Meteorological history
- Formed: July 9, 1978
- Extratropical: July 28, 1978
- Dissipated: July 31, 1978

Category 4 major hurricane
- 1-minute sustained (SSHWS/NWS)
- Highest winds: 140 mph (220 km/h)
- Lowest pressure: ≤955 mbar (hPa); ≤28.20 inHg

Overall effects
- Fatalities: None
- Damage: $200,000 (1978 USD)
- Areas affected: Hawaii, Aleutian Islands
- IBTrACS
- Part of the 1978 Pacific hurricane season

Hurricane Fico was the longest-lived tropical cyclone of the 1978 Pacific hurricane season and became the longest-lasting Pacific hurricane on record, a record broken by Hurricane Tina fourteen years later. The sixth tropical storm, fourth hurricane, and third major hurricane, Fico developed from a tropical disturbance off the Pacific coast of Mexico on July 9. It moved northwestward and then westward, quickly reaching peak winds of 140 mph (230 km/h) on July 12. Moving nearly due westward, the intensity of Fico fluctuated from Category 1 to Category 4 status on the Saffir–Simpson hurricane scale for the following days, and it passed about 170 miles (270 km) south of Hawaii on July 20 with winds of 115 mph (185 km/h). Fico slowly weakened as it turned to the northwest over cooler waters, and became an extratropical cyclone on July 28 to the northeast of Midway Island.

Swells from Fico, combined with swells from a storm in the Southern Hemisphere, produced rough surf throughout the Hawaiian islands. The surf destroyed one house and resulted in considerable damage along the southern coast of the island of Hawaii. No deaths were reported, and damage totaled $200,000 (1978 USD, $619,000 2006 USD).

== Meteorological history ==
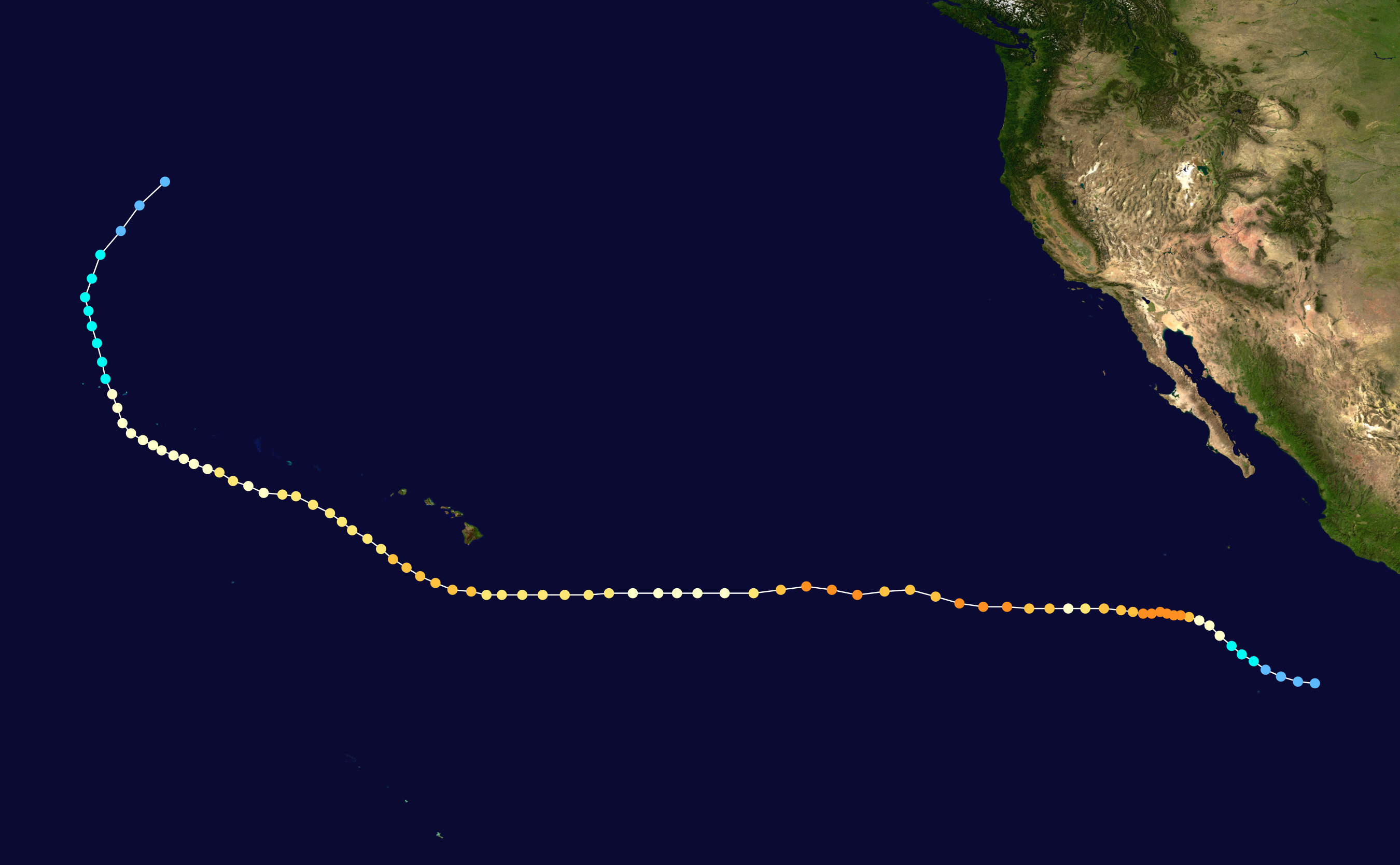
Map plotting the storm's track and intensity, according to the Saffir–Simpson scale Map key Saffir–Simpson scale Tropical depression (≤38 mph, ≤62 km/h) Tropical storm (39–73 mph, 63–118 km/h) Category 1 (74–95 mph, 119–153 km/h) Category 2 (96–110 mph, 154–177 km/h) Category 3 (111–129 mph, 178–208 km/h) Category 4 (130–156 mph, 209–251 km/h) Category 5 (≥157 mph, ≥252 km/h) Unknown Storm type Tropical cyclone Subtropical cyclone Extratropical cyclone, remnant low, tropical disturbance, or monsoon depression

A tropical disturbance persisted 520 miles (840 km) south of Acapulco on July 3. It moved steadily westward and organized over warm water temperatures of 81 °F (27 °C). A circulation developed within the system, and on July 9 it organized into Tropical Depression Seven while located about 580 miles (930 km) southwest of Acapulco. The depression turned to the west-northwest, and after briefly weakening it organized more to attain tropical storm status on July 10 while located about 745 miles (1,199 km) south of the southern tip of Baja California Peninsula.

Tropical Storm Fico turned to the northwest after reaching tropical storm status, and entered an area of increasingly warm water temperatures. It quickly strengthened, and 18 hours after becoming a tropical storm Fico strengthened into a hurricane. As the hurricane turned to the west-northwest, a well-defined eye developed in the center of the hurricane, and Fico continued to quickly intensify. Fico attained Category 4 strength about 24 hours after it first became a hurricane, and on July 12 it reached peak winds of 140 mph (230 km/h) while located 640 miles (1,030 km) southwest of Cabo San Lucas. Throughout its duration, the eye of the hurricane was around 35 miles (56 km) in diameter.

While moving nearly due westward, Fico maintained peak winds for about 12 hours before weakening over cooler water temperatures. On July 14, passing over an area of 79 °F (26 °C) waters, the hurricane became disorganized while its winds dropped to 90 mph (140 km/h). Shortly thereafter, it again moved into an area of 83 °F (28 °C) waters, and again reached winds of 135 mph (217 km/h) on July 15. For 48 hours, Fico's winds fluctuated slightly, briefly dropping to 120 mph (190 km/h) before strengthening again to 135 mph (217 km/h). On July 17 the hurricane again began to weaken, and its winds dropped to 90 mph (140 km/h) as Fico entered the Central Pacific Hurricane Center area of responsibility. Fico slowly restrengthened and reached Category 3 status late on July 20 while passing about 170 miles (270 km) south of the island of Hawaii. The hurricane turned to the northwest toward an upper-level trough of low pressure, and after maintaining 115 mph (185 km/h) winds for about 36 hours it slowly weakened. On July 27 after entering an area of progressively cooler waters, Fico weakened to a tropical storm while located about 35 miles (56 km) east-northeast of Midway Island. It weakened to a tropical depression the next day, and late on July 28, after turning to the north, Fico became an extratropical depression. An approaching cold front absorbed the remnants of Fico and passed near southern Alaska on July 31. Ships to the southeast of Cold Bay reported heavy rainfall and strong winds in association with the remnants of Fico.

== Impact ==
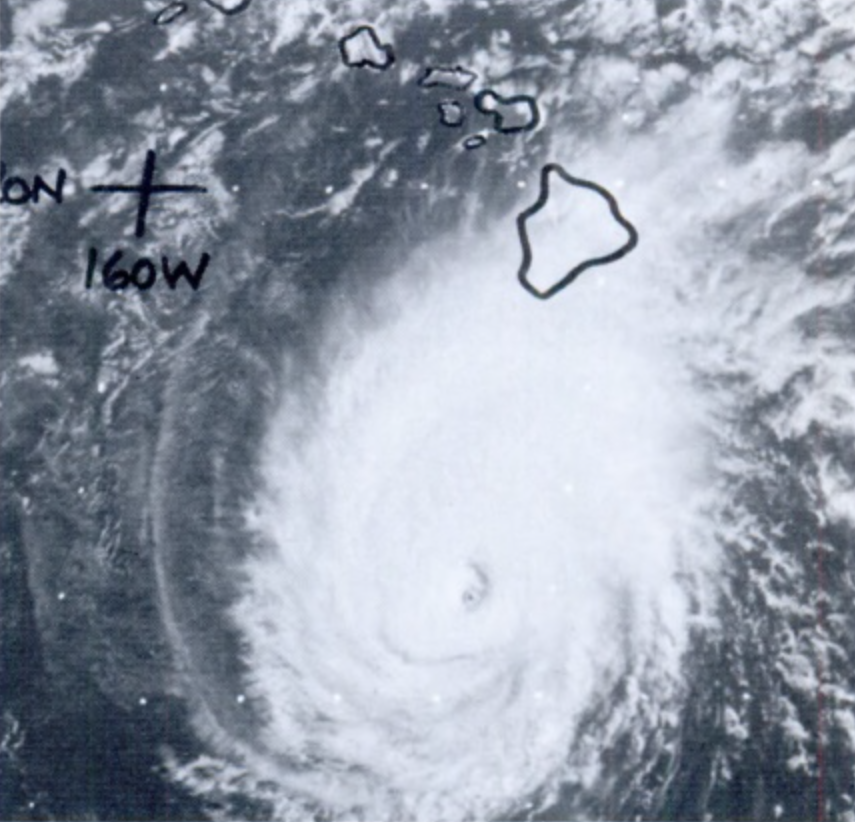
Hurricane Fico on July 20 to the south of Hawaii

The huricane produced high surf along the coastline of Hawaii, in combination with a strong southerly swell from a southern hemisphere storm. The east coast of the island of Hawaii received wave heights of 20 feet (6.1 m), causing flooding. High surf resulted in considerable damage to roads and beachfront houses along the Big Island shores. The waves destroyed a home in Puna and wrecked a beach pavilion in Kau. Eastern Maui reported up to 12-foot (3.7 m) waves, which flooded roads. Southern Oahu and Kauai also reported slightly above normal waves. The high seas washed a 65-foot (20 m) tugboat ashore on a reef at Kukuiula. Six people aboard a sloop off Hanalei were rescued by a Navy torpedo boat after it lost its auxiliary power and was unable to progress in the strong winds of Fico. A strong trade wind gradient, increased due to the presence of the hurricane, produced winds of over 60 mph (97 km/h) throughout the island chain, which knocked down trees and caused power outages. Hurricane Fico also dropped 6 inches (150 mm) of rainfall in Oahu. The mayors of three Hawaiian cities issued a disaster declaration for their cities following the damage from Fico. Damage from the hurricane totaled $200,000 (1978 USD).

== Records and retirement ==
Fico was a northeast Pacific tropical cyclone for 20 days or 468 hours, breaking the previous record since the beginning of reliable satellite monitoring set by Hurricane Celeste of 1972 with 16 days. Fico was also a hurricane for 17 days, which also broke the record set by Celeste of 1972 with 10 days. Both records were later broken by Hurricane Tina. Fico also tracked about 6,000 miles (9,700 km), among the longest tracks on record for a Pacific hurricane.

The World Meteorological Organization retired the name Fico from future use following the 1978 season. It was replaced with Fabio for the 1982 season. The name Fico was new to the storm naming lists in 1978, as that was the first Pacific hurricane season to feature both male and female names.

== See also ==
- Hurricane John (1994)
- Hurricane Dora (1999)
- List of Pacific hurricanes
- List of retired Pacific hurricane names
- List of Hawaii hurricanes
- List of Alaska tropical cyclones
- List of Category 4 Pacific hurricanes
