= 1972 Pacific hurricane season =

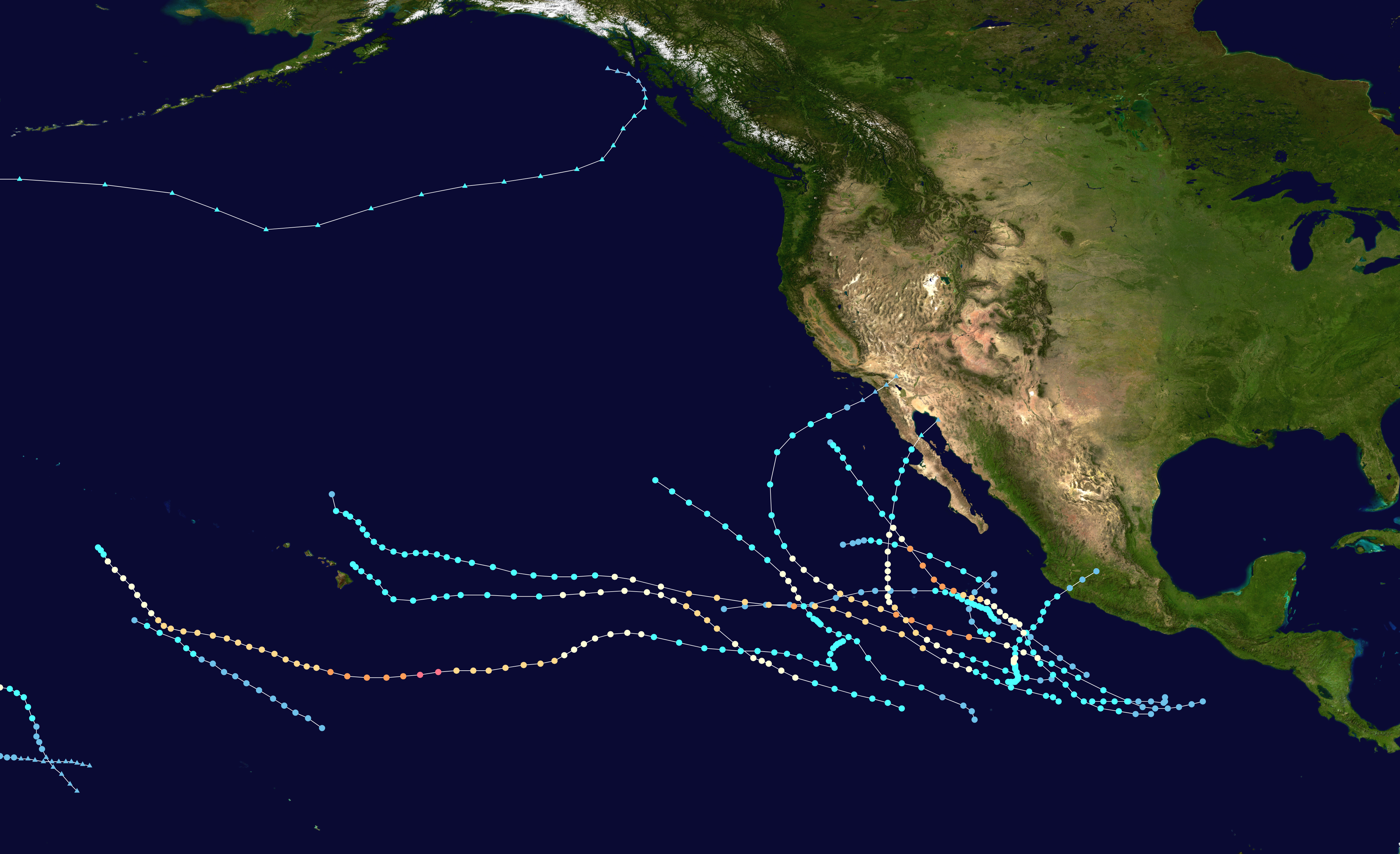
- Season summary map

Seasonal boundaries
- First system formed: June 1, 1972
- Last system dissipated: November 20, 1972

Strongest storm
- Name: Celeste
  - Maximum winds: 130 mph (215 km/h) (1-minute sustained)
  - Lowest pressure: 940 mbar (hPa; 27.76 inHg)

Seasonal statistics
- Total depressions: 20
- Total storms: 14
- Hurricanes: 9
- Major hurricanes (Cat. 3+): 4
- Total fatalities: 1
- Total damage: At least $75,000 (1972 USD)

Related articles
- 1972 Atlantic hurricane season; 1972 Pacific typhoon season; 1972 North Indian Ocean cyclone season

The 1972 Pacific hurricane season was an ongoing event in tropical cyclone meteorology. There were few notable storms this year. Only one person was killed and storm effects were almost not serious at all. The most notable systems were Hurricane Celeste and Joanne. Celeste was the strongest storm of the season, and caused heavy damage to Johnston Atoll. Hurricane Joanne brought gale-force winds to the Continental United States and caused flooding in Arizona and northern Mexico, which killed one person. The only other system to directly impact land was Hurricane Annette.

The season began on May 15, 1972, in the east Pacific, and on June 1, 1972, in the central Pacific. It ended on November 30, 1972. These dates conventionally delimit the period of time when tropical cyclones form in the east Pacific Ocean. This season had a below average number of storms. There were twenty tropical cyclones, four of which were in the central Pacific. Of those, four were tropical storms, eight were hurricanes, and four were major hurricanes that reached Category 3 or higher on the Saffir–Simpson hurricane scale. In the central Pacific, two tropical storms and two tropical depressions formed. One of the depressions and one of the storms crossed the International Date Line to become typhoons in the 1972 Pacific typhoon season.

== Timeline ==
The 1972 Pacific hurricane season began with the formation of Hurricane Annette on June 1, and the season ended with the dissipation of Tropical Depression Sixteen on November 21, spanning 173 days. In the northeastern Pacific (from the North American coastline to 140°W), one storm formed in June, one in July, six in August, two in September, and one in November. In the central Pacific (from 140°W to 180°W), one storm formed in September and one in November. This season is tied with the 1977 and 1996 seasons for the second-fewest number of tropical storms to form in the eastern Pacific in July since the start of the satellite era in 1971, behind only the 2010 season. The 1972 season also shares the record for busiest November in the central Pacific with the 1957 and 1982 seasons.

== Systems ==
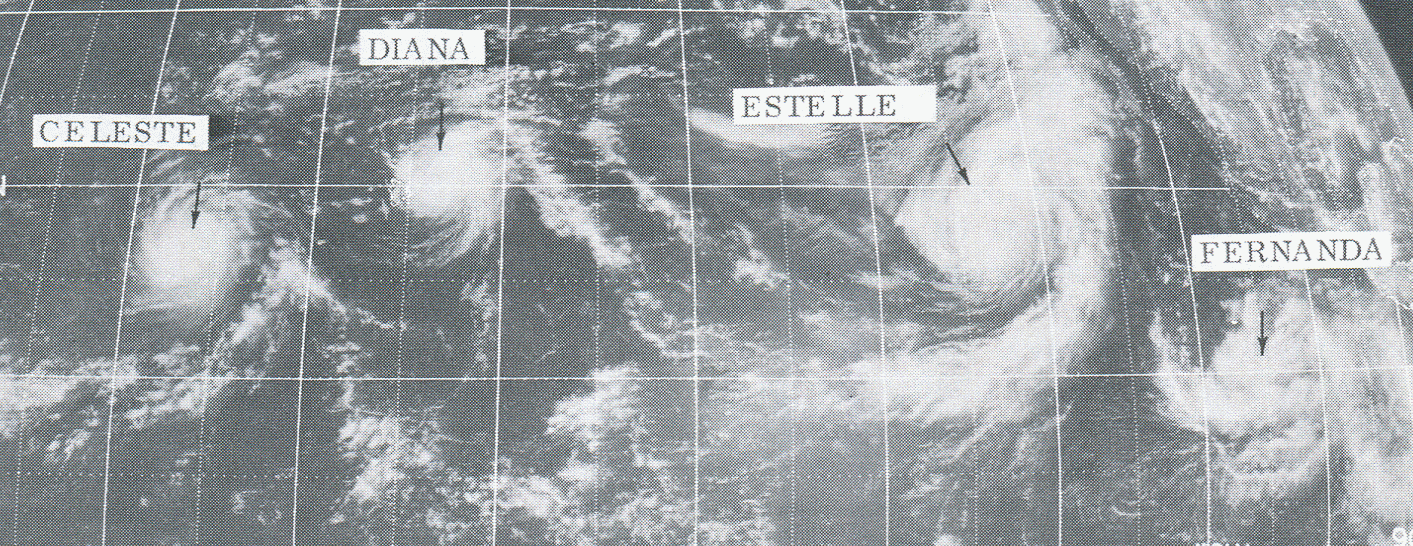
This ATS 1 weather satellite image of Tropical Cyclones Celeste, Diana, Estelle, and Fernanda was taken on August 18, 1972

Of this season's fourteen named tropical cyclones, twelve formed in the eastern Pacific and two in the central. Both central Pacific tropical cyclones were tropical storms. Of the eastern Pacific systems, four were tropical storms and eight were hurricanes. Of those eight hurricanes, four were major hurricanes because they peaked as Category 3 or higher on the Saffir–Simpson hurricane scale. Although these totals are below the modern long-term averages of fifteen named storms, nine hurricanes, and four major hurricanes, At the time, 1972 was the central north Pacific's busiest known season.

=== Hurricane Annette ===
- Category 1 hurricane (SSHWS)
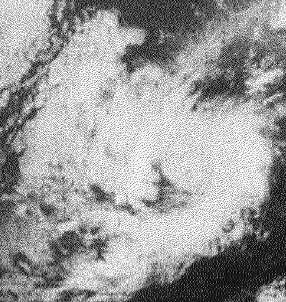
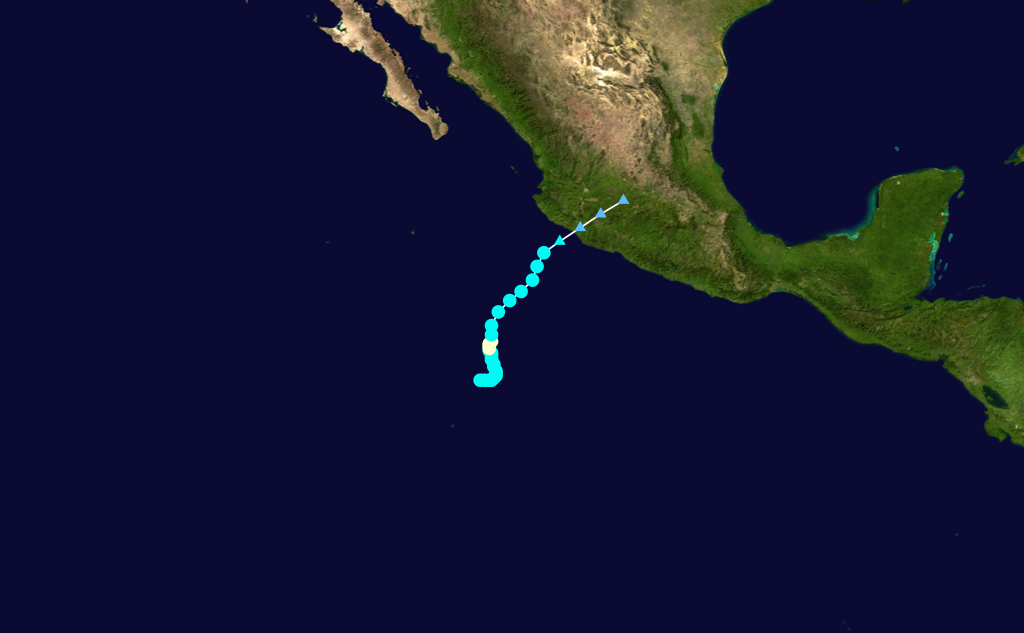
- Duration: June 1 – June 8
- Peak intensity: 85 mph (140 km/h) (1-min); ≤993 mbar (hPa)

On June 1, a tropical disturbance organized into a tropical storm. It slowly moved north and then recurved to the northeast as it accelerated slightly. It intensified into a hurricane on June 4. It remained at that strength for one day. Annette then began weakening. As a tropical storm, Annette made landfall in southeast of Manzanillo on June 7. The next day, it dissipated inland.

Annette brought several days of rainy weather to parts of Mexico. However, no deaths or damage were attributed to this tropical cyclone.

=== Tropical Depression Two ===
Tropical Depression Two existed from June 27 to June 28. It paralleled the coast of Mexico without making landfall.

=== Tropical Depression Three ===
Tropical Depression Three formed on July 4 and dissipated two days later. It moved westward while out to sea and never approached land.

=== Tropical Storm Bonny ===
- Tropical storm (SSHWS)
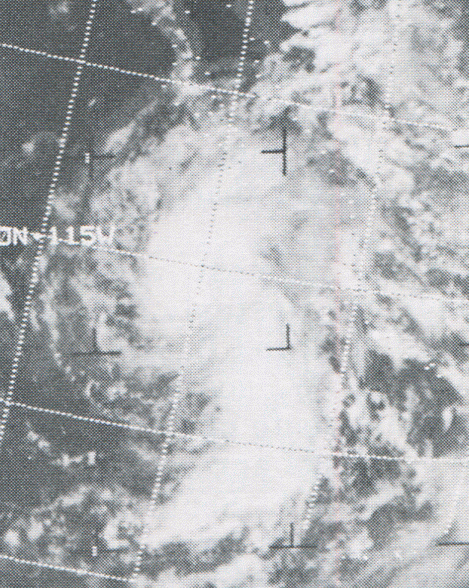
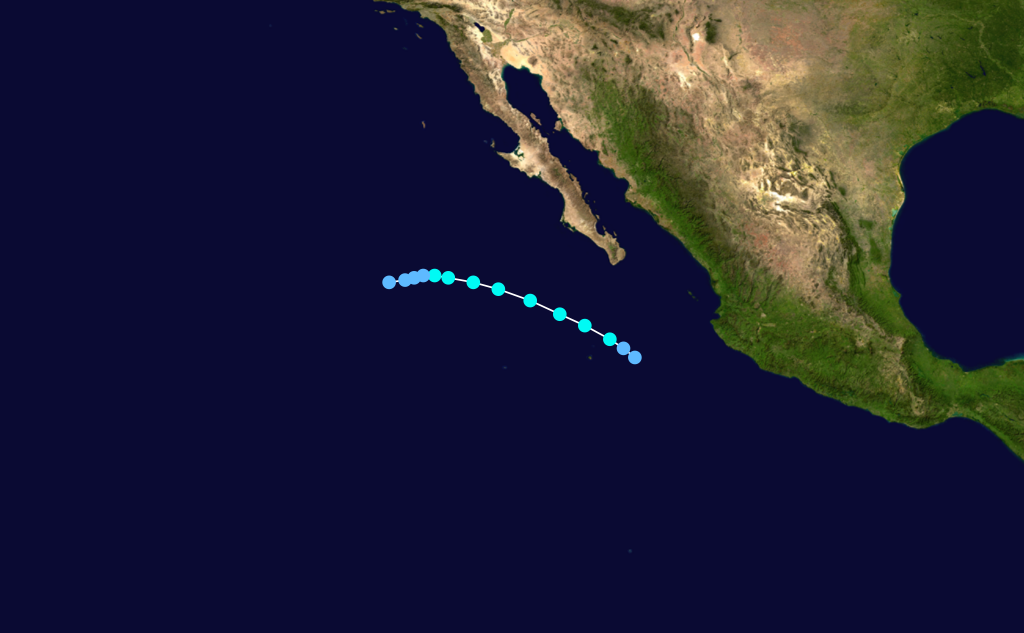
- Duration: July 27 – July 30
- Peak intensity: 50 mph (85 km/h) (1-min); 993 mbar (hPa)

Only July 27, fifty days after the dissipation of Tropical Depression Annette, an area of clouds southwest of Manzanillo developed a closed circulation and became a tropical depression. The next day, it strengthened into a tropical storm. Heading generally west northwest, Bonny peaked in intensity on July 28. It weakened after that, and dissipated July 30. Bonny never came near land and caused no known impact.

=== Hurricane Celeste ===
- Category 4 hurricane (SSHWS)
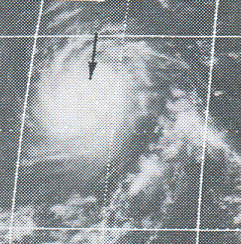
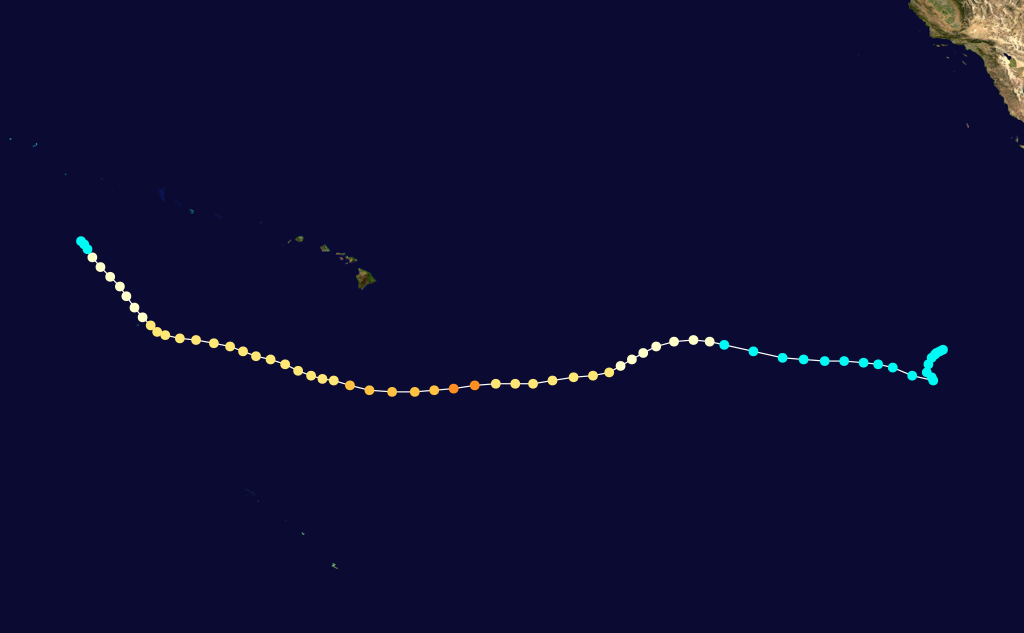
- Duration: August 6 – August 22
- Peak intensity: 130 mph (215 km/h) (1-min); 940 mbar (hPa)

On August 6, a tropical disturbance developed into a tropical storm, skipping the depression stage. It edged south until August 8. At that point, it turned to the west. It would continue in that general direction until it dissipated. Celeste intensified into a hurricane on August 10. It then left the Eastern Pacific Hurricane Center's area of responsibility and entered the central Pacific. Celeste continued intensifying and eventually peaked as a Category 4 hurricane on the Saffir–Simpson hurricane scale. Celeste's Category 4 winds and central pressure of 940 millibars (940 hPa) made it the most intense cyclone of the season. After that, Celeste steadily weakened. After turning north, it dissipated on August 22 due to wind shear.

Celeste harassed several ships during its existence. The most serious incident involved a sailing vessel called the Regina Marina. On August 9, that ship was flooded and had to issue a distress call. It was spotted by a hurricane hunter and was reached and towed to safety by another ship, the Vishea Trith, and later on, the USCGC Mellon. Two people aboard the Regina Marina were treated for injuries. Celeste passed close to Johnston Atoll and was the first recorded hurricane to hit that island. Many buildings on the weather station on the island lost roof tiles, and parts of most buildings were sandblasted by the wind. Celeste brought the highest recorded sustained winds in the station's thirteen years of operation, and the lowest barometric pressure ever recorded at Johnston at the time. A total of 6.21 inches (160 mm) of rain was recorded by a rain gauge; this may be an underestimate due to the gauge's funnel being partly blocked by a lump of coral. Program 437, an anti-satellite weapons system, was destroyed by the hurricane. On Johnston, no casualties were reported due to evacuations of the island's inhabitants. High waves also pounded the Puna, Kau, and South Kona Coasts of the Big Island. An exact estimate of damage is not available.

At the time, Celeste was longest-lasting Pacific hurricane with a lifespan of 16.25 days; that record was tied next season by Hurricane Doreen and outrun by Hurricane Fico in 1978. It is the ninth-longest lasting Pacific hurricane, tied with Kenneth (2005) and 1973's Doreen.

=== Hurricane Diana ===
- Category 2 hurricane (SSHWS)
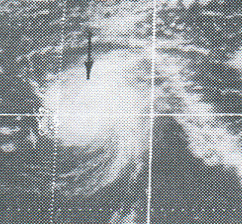
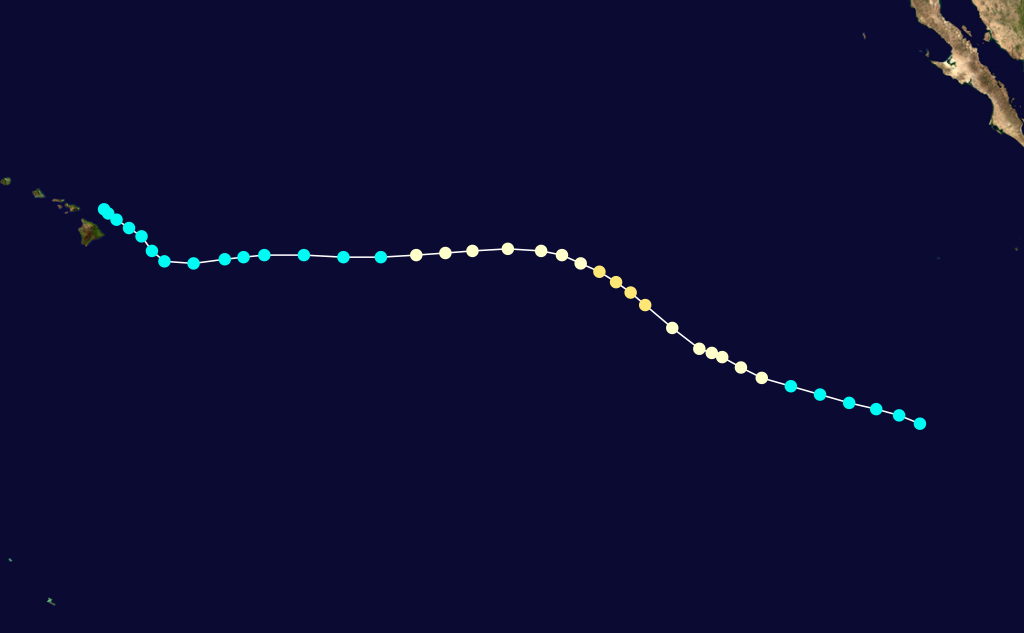
- Duration: August 11 – August 20
- Peak intensity: 110 mph (175 km/h) (1-min); 968 mbar (hPa)

On August 11, a tropical storm formed. It headed to the west northwest and strengthened into a hurricane on August 12. Diana then turned to the northwest, and peaked in intensity on August 1. It then headed west, and crossed into the central Pacific as a Category 1 hurricane. Shortly after crossing the basin boundary on a path directly towards the Hawaiian Islands, Diana weakened into a tropical storm. On August 18, Diana turned to the northwest. It dissipated two days later.

Diana threatened the Hawaiian Islands enough to warrant the issuance of a tropical storm warning. Although it never made landfall, Diana dumped very heavy rain on the Big Island, though without flooding; the highest total was 10 inches (250 mm) somewhere northeast of Hilo. At Vacationland, surf swept four homes off their foundations, doing extensive damage to one of them. Another home was flooded. Debris was carried inland, and 200 feet (60 m) of private roads were washed away. The cost of damage to the extensively damaged house was $75,000 (1972 USD; $577,267 2026 USD), furnishings excluded.

=== Hurricane Estelle ===
- Category 1 hurricane (SSHWS)
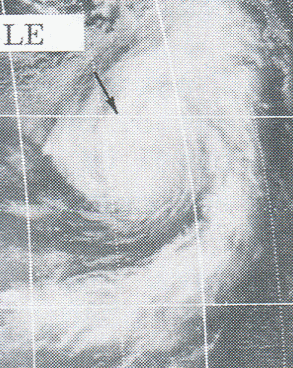
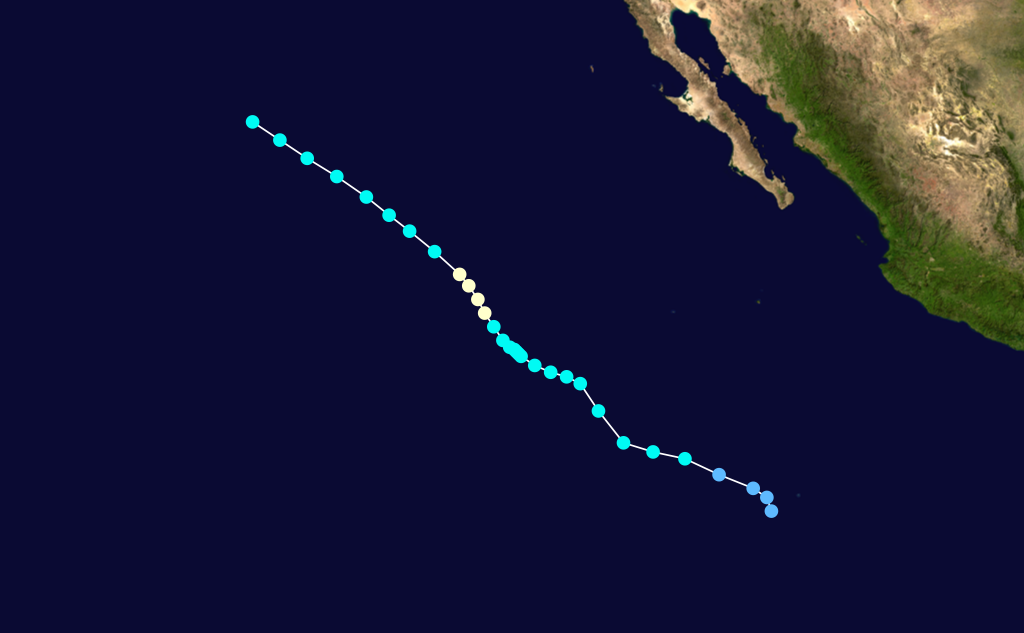
- Duration: August 15 – August 22
- Peak intensity: 80 mph (130 km/h) (1-min); 1004 mbar (hPa)

A swirl of thunderstorms near Clipperton Island became a tropical depression on August 15. It moved generally northwest. The depression strengthened into a tropical storm on August 16. Estelle continued to intensify, and became a hurricane on August 19. After peaking the next day, Estelle slowly weakened. It became a tropical storm on August 20 and dissipated two days later. Hurricane Estelle spent its entire life well away from inhabited land, and consequently caused no deaths or damage.

=== Hurricane Fernanda ===
- Category 3 hurricane (SSHWS)
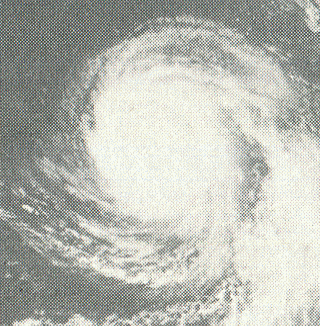
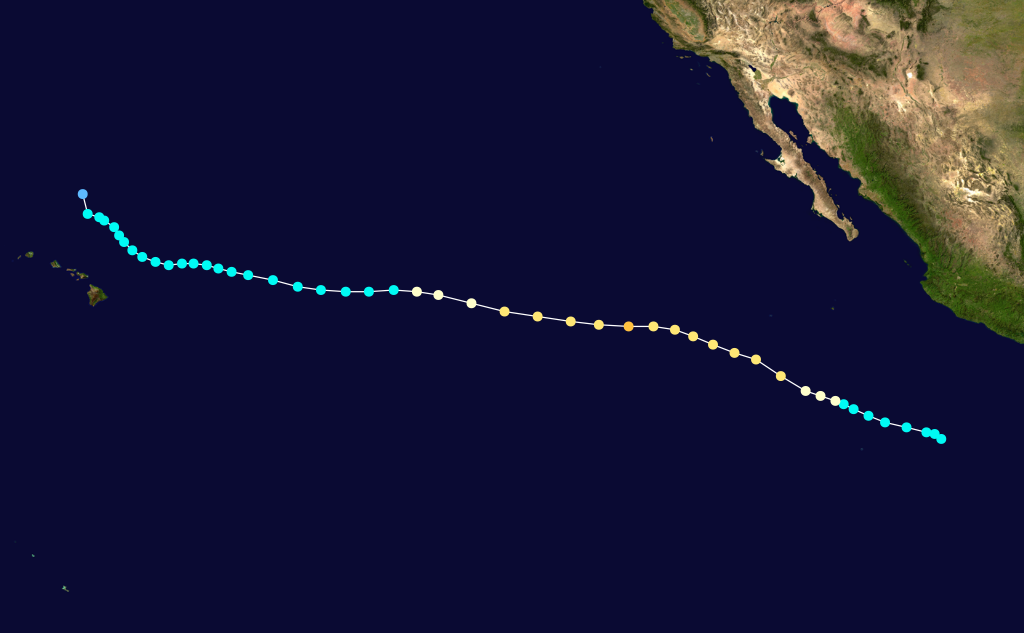
- Duration: August 20 – September 1
- Peak intensity: 115 mph (185 km/h) (1-min); ≤948 mbar (hPa)

An area of disturbed weather was witnessed well south of mainland Mexico on August 18. The system developed into a tropical storm on August 20. It slowly strengthened, moving generally west-northwest, and became a hurricane on August 22. It continued strengthening, and was briefly a Category 3 major hurricane on 24. Fernanda weakened after that, and it was a tropical storm by the time it crossed 140°W and entered the central Pacific. It remained at a steady intensity until it rapidly weakened when north of Kauai on September 1. A flash flood on Waipio Stream in the Big Island's Kohala Mountains may have been due to Fernanda. Other than that, this tropical cyclone caused no known impact.

=== Hurricane Gwen ===
- Category 3 hurricane (SSHWS)
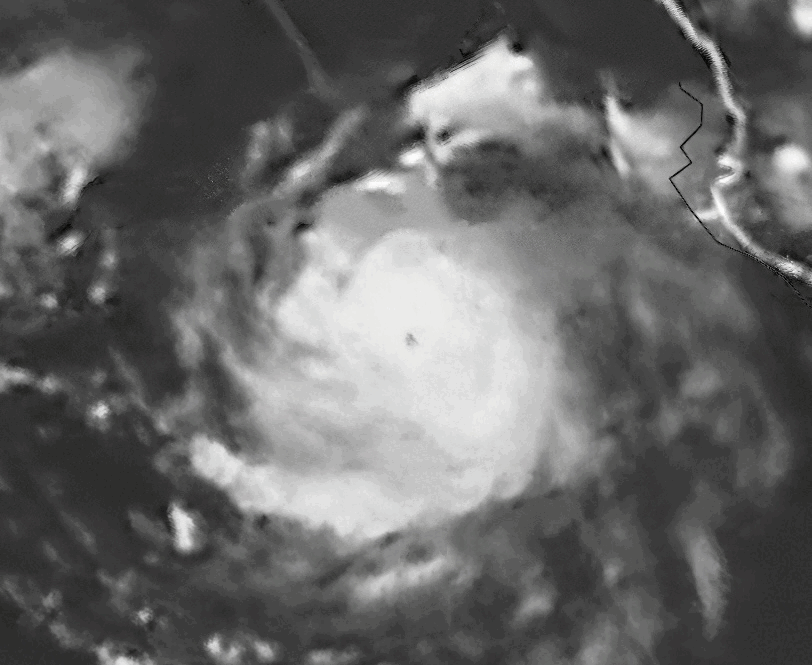
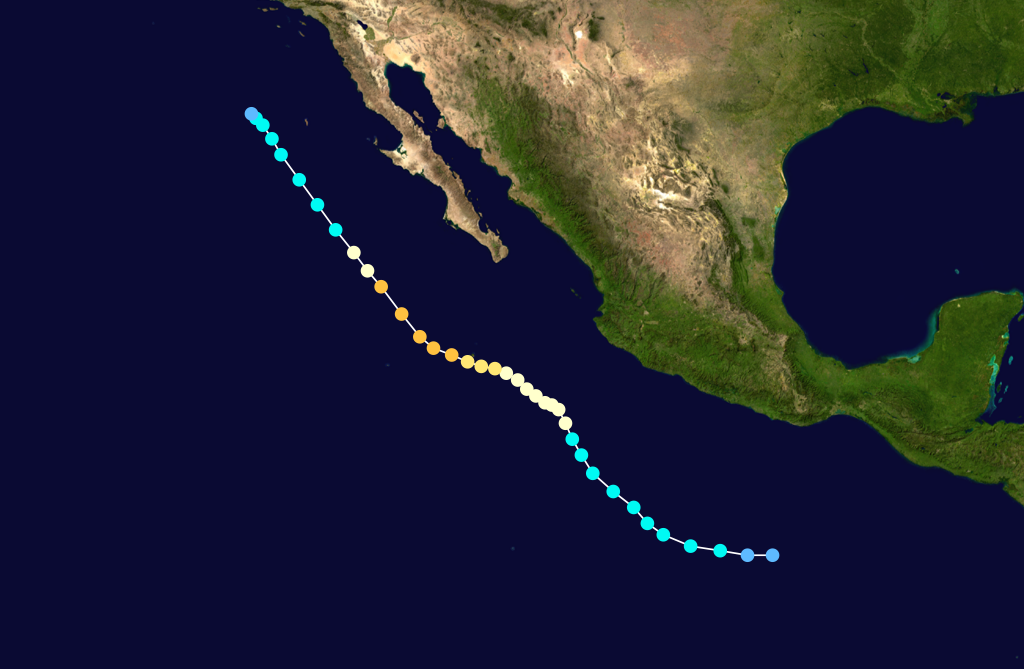
- Duration: August 22 – August 31
- Peak intensity: 125 mph (205 km/h) (1-min); ≤941 mbar (hPa)

On August 22, a tropical depression formed from a disturbance. It immediately strengthened into a storm and was named Gwen. Gwen moved generally northwest, paralleling the coast of Mexico, and intensified into a hurricane on August 24. It then spent a few days heading west-northwest before resuming its original course. The hurricane became a major hurricane on August 27. After retaining that intensity for over a day, it rapidly weakened. Gwen became a tropical storm on August 29, weakened into a depression the next day, and dissipated just after that. Hurricane Gwen caused some concern for high surf in California, including a forecast for storm surge, but only the high surf materialized. Hurricane Gwen caused no deaths or damage.

=== Hurricane Hyacinth ===
- Category 3 hurricane (SSHWS)
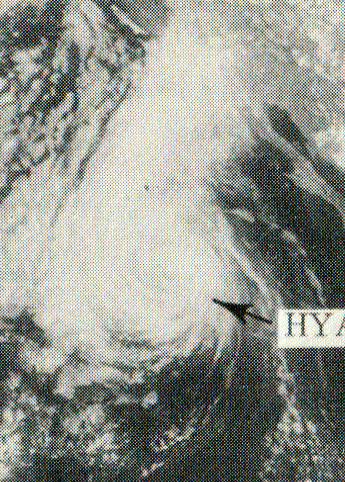
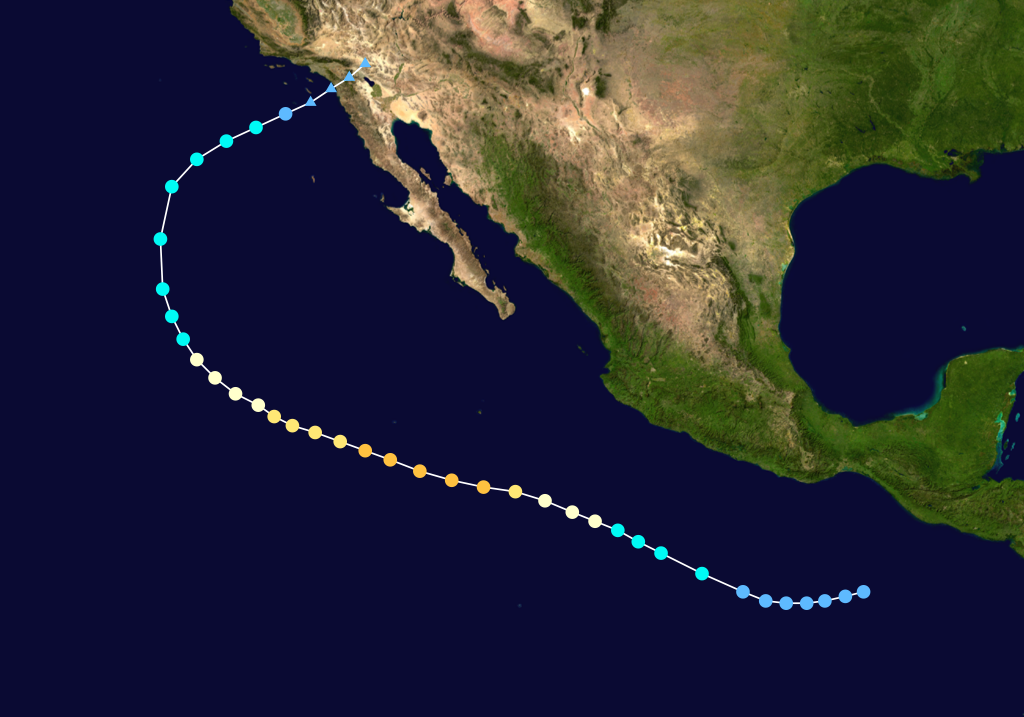
- Duration: August 28 – September 7
- Peak intensity: 125 mph (205 km/h) (1-min); ≤962 mbar (hPa)

A circulation south of the Gulf of Tehuantepec organized into a tropical depression on August 28. It moved west for a day and then turned to the west northwest. It intensified into a tropical storm on August 29 and a hurricane the next day. Hyacinth peaked as a Category 3 major hurricane on August 31 through September 1. It then weakened. It also began to recurve to the north and then the northeast. Hyacinth reached its westernmost point on September 4 while a tropical storm. On September 6, it weakened into a tropical depression. It then made landfall north of San Diego, California, as a depression later that day, but it was nearly dissipated.

Hyacinth caused increased surf along the coast of California, but was otherwise without serious effects. Tropical Depression Hyacinth's landfall was the first in California since 1939.

=== Tropical Storm Iva ===
- Tropical storm (SSHWS)
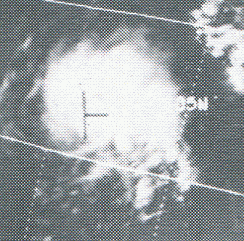
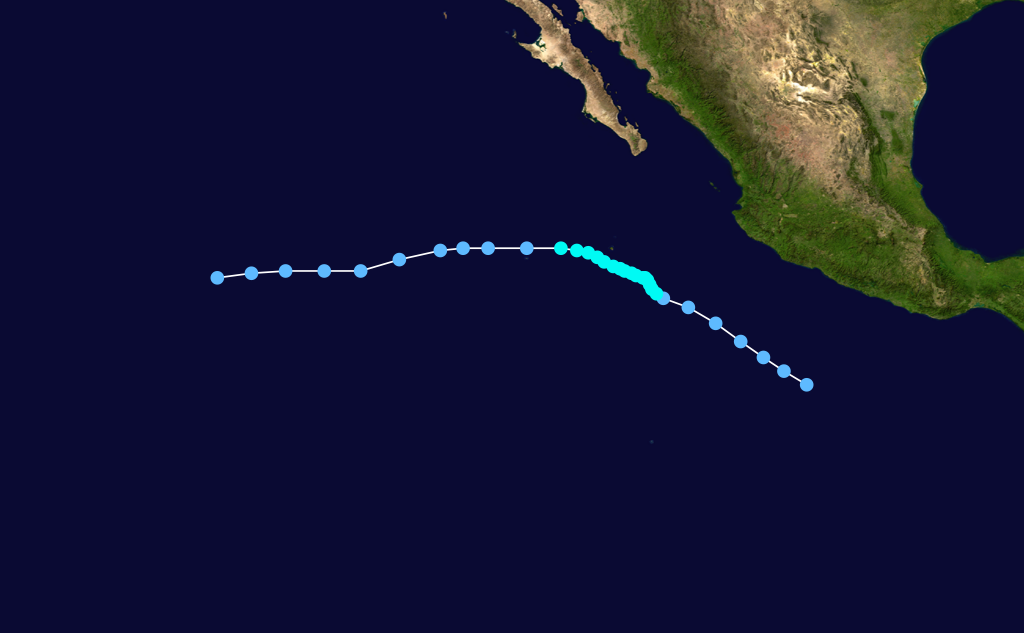
- Duration: September 14 – September 22
- Peak intensity: 50 mph (85 km/h) (1-min); ≤999 mbar (hPa)

South of Salina Cruz, a tropical depression formed on September 14. It paralleled the coast of Mexico until it strengthened into a tropical storm on September 16. Iva spent three days barely moving. On August 19, Iva got caught in the trade winds, headed westwards out to sea, and promptly weakened into a depression. By September 22 it was just a mass of clouds. Iva did not come near land and had no appreciable impact.

=== Tropical Storm June ===
- Tropical storm (SSHWS)
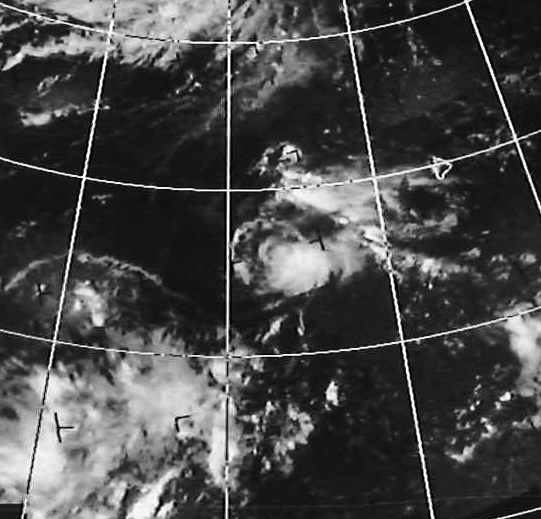
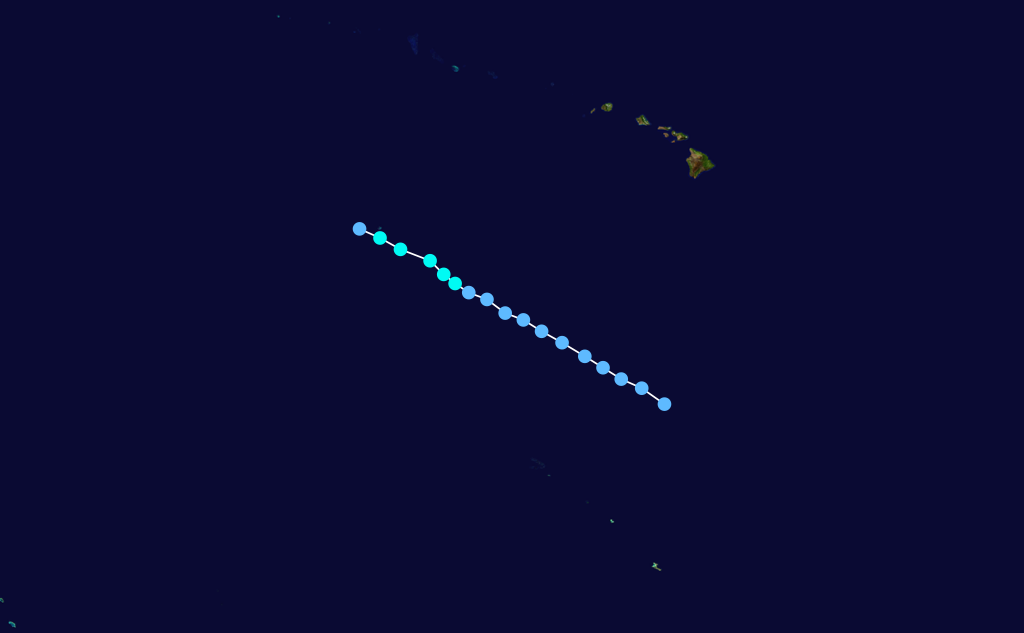
- Duration: September 24 – September 28
- Peak intensity: 60 mph (95 km/h) (1-min);

A northwestward-moving disturbance in the Intertropical Convergence Zone developed into a tropical depression on September 24 and a storm two days later. It never strengthened much, and rapidly weakened on September 28. Tropical Storm June passed southwest of Johnston Island on September 27, but was too feeble to cause damage, only bringing gusty breezes and some rain.

=== Unnumbered tropical depression ===
- Tropical depression (SSHWS)
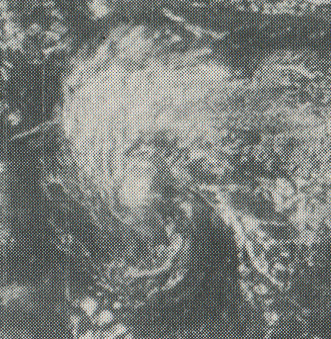
- Duration: September 28 – October 3
- Peak intensity: 35 mph (55 km/h) (1-min);

A tropical depression formed September 28 east of the Hawaiian Islands. It headed towards the archipelago and dissipated on the afternoon of October 3. Later that day, its remnants dumped up to 10.5 in (270 mm) of rain on the mountains of the Big Island.

=== Hurricane Joanne ===
- Category 2 hurricane (SSHWS)
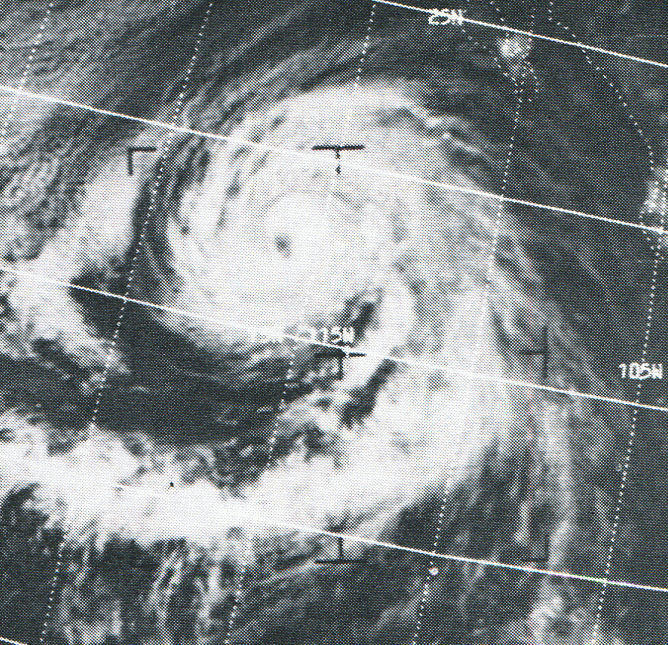
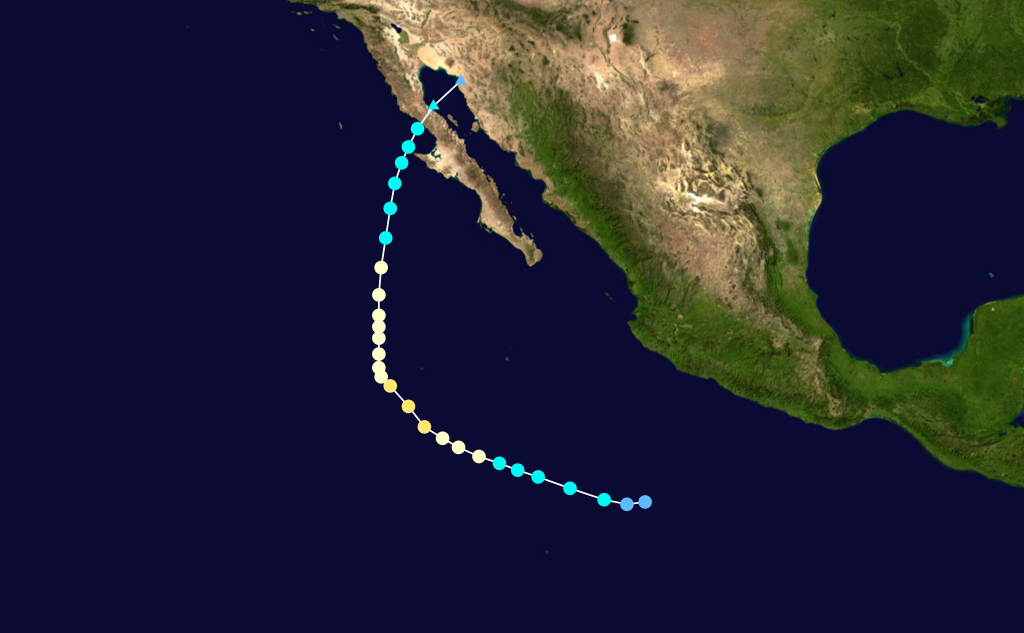
- Duration: September 30 – October 7
- Peak intensity: 100 mph (155 km/h) (1-min); ≤971 mbar (hPa)

A westward-moving area of squalls south of Mexico organized into a tropical depression on September 30. It then strengthened into a tropical storm and was named Joanne. Joanne moved west northwest, and intensified into a hurricane on October 1. It then peaked as a Category 2 hurricane on October 2. Joanne then slowed down and began to recurve, first to the north, and then the north northeast. While accelerating in that direction, Joanne made landfall near Laguna Chapala on the Baja California Peninsula as a tropical storm. Joanne managed to retain a closed circulation and bring tropical storm force winds to Arizona, the first recorded time that had happened. The tropical storm dissipated inland over Sonora on October 7. Joanne is one of only four known Pacific hurricanes to bring gale-force winds to the Continental United States, and was the first since the 1939 California tropical storm.

Heavy rainfall was reported throughout Arizona. Over 5 inches (100 mm) was measured at the Mogollon Rim. Heavy rains were recorded elsewhere in the region. The rains caused flooding in the areas of Clifton, Duncan, and Safford. The highest total in Mexico was 9.45 in (240 mm) in San Felipe/Mexicali, while the highest total in the United States was 4.34 in (110 mm) in Sierra Ancha. Joanne also caused heavy surf in California. A young man in Phoenix was electrocuted and killed when he attempted to remove a downed power line from his car.

=== Tropical Depression Thirteen ===
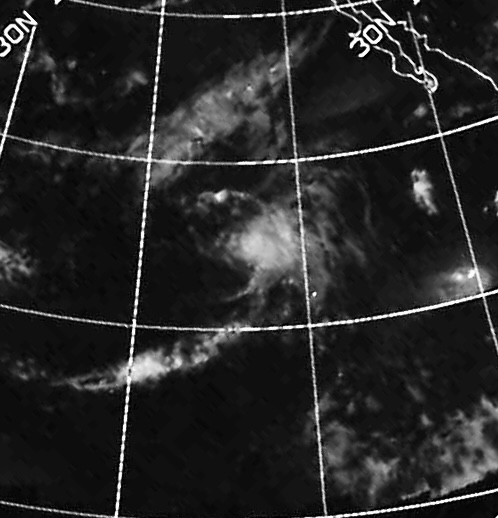
- Duration: October 12 – October 18

Tropical Depression Thirteen formed on October 12. It first headed southwest, then west, and performed a cyclonic loop. It headed north before sharply recurving. It dissipated on October 18.

=== Tropical Storm Kathleen ===
- Tropical storm (SSHWS)
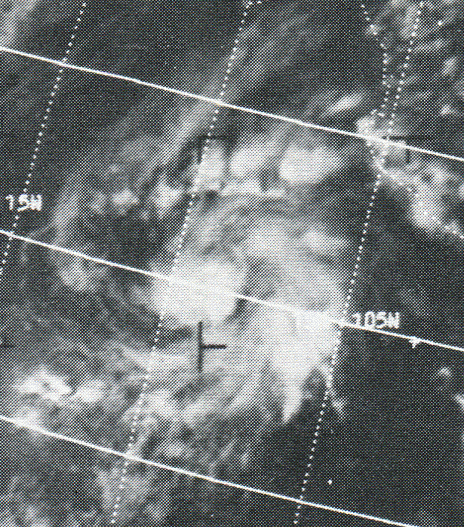
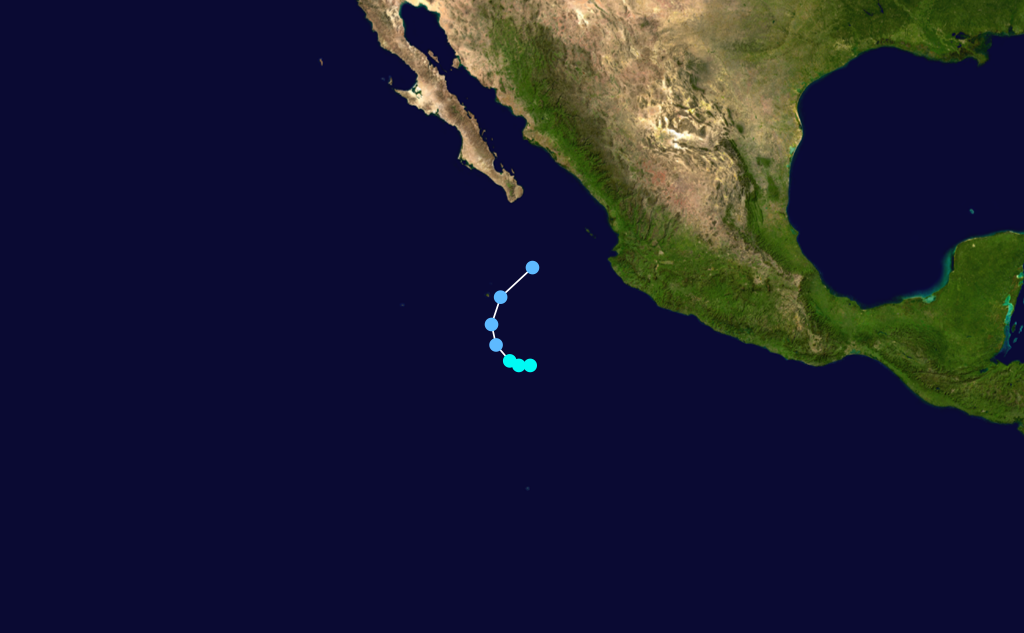
- Duration: October 18 – October 19
- Peak intensity: 45 mph (75 km/h) (1-min);

On October 18, a vortex in the Intertropical Convergence Zone was determined to be a tropical storm through the use of satellite pictures. Kathleen was a tropical storm for only eighteen hours before weakening into a tropical depression and recurving to the northeast. The tropical cyclone dissipated on October 19 while out to sea west of Puerto Vallarta. No deaths or damages were reported.

=== Tropical Depression Olga ===
- Tropical depression (SSHWS)
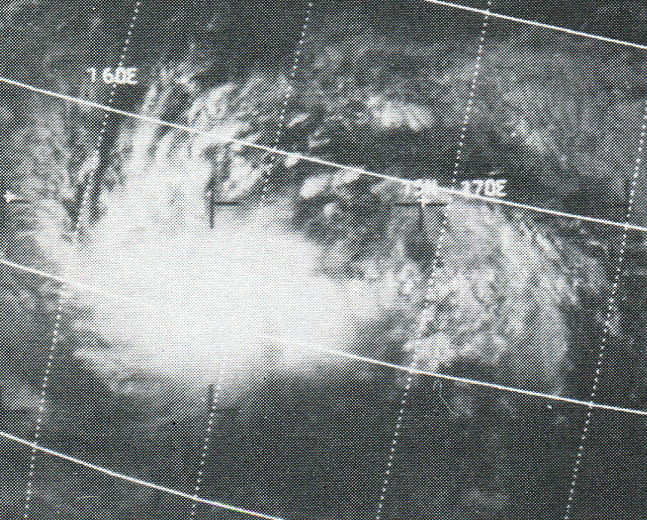
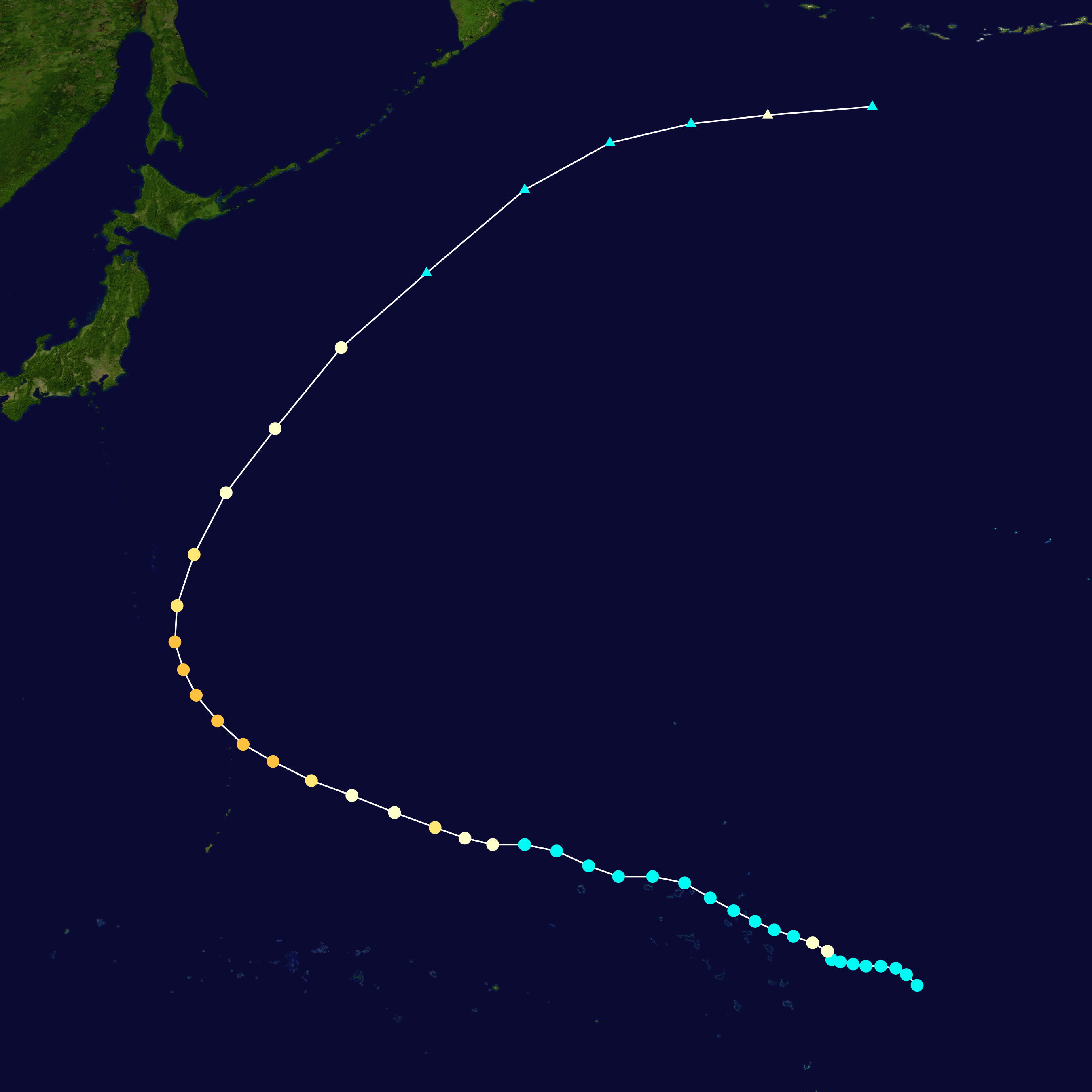
- Duration: October 19 – October 19
- Peak intensity: 35 mph (55 km/h) (1-min);

On October 16, the northern hemisphere component of a "cyclone twin" was classified by JTWC as a tropical depression while located near 7.0°N 179°W, just within the central Pacific basin. After crossing the International Date Line, it intensified into Tropical Storm Olga of the 1972 Pacific typhoon season. After passing through the Marshalls as a tropical storm, Olga intensified into a typhoon on October 25. It then swung through part of the Northern Marianas Islands before it was absorbed by a front near Honshū on October 29. As the NMI had already been hit by Typhoon Marie three weeks earlier, little damage was reported.

=== Hurricane Ruby ===
- Category 1 hurricane (SSHWS)
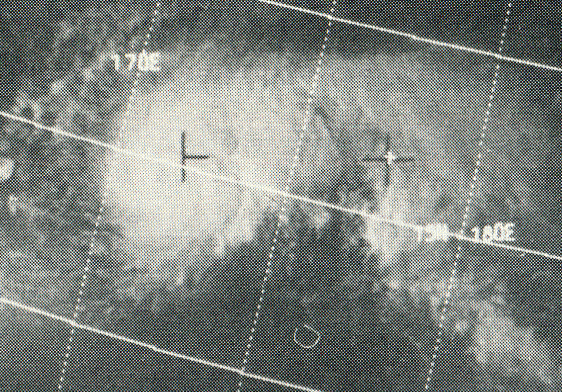
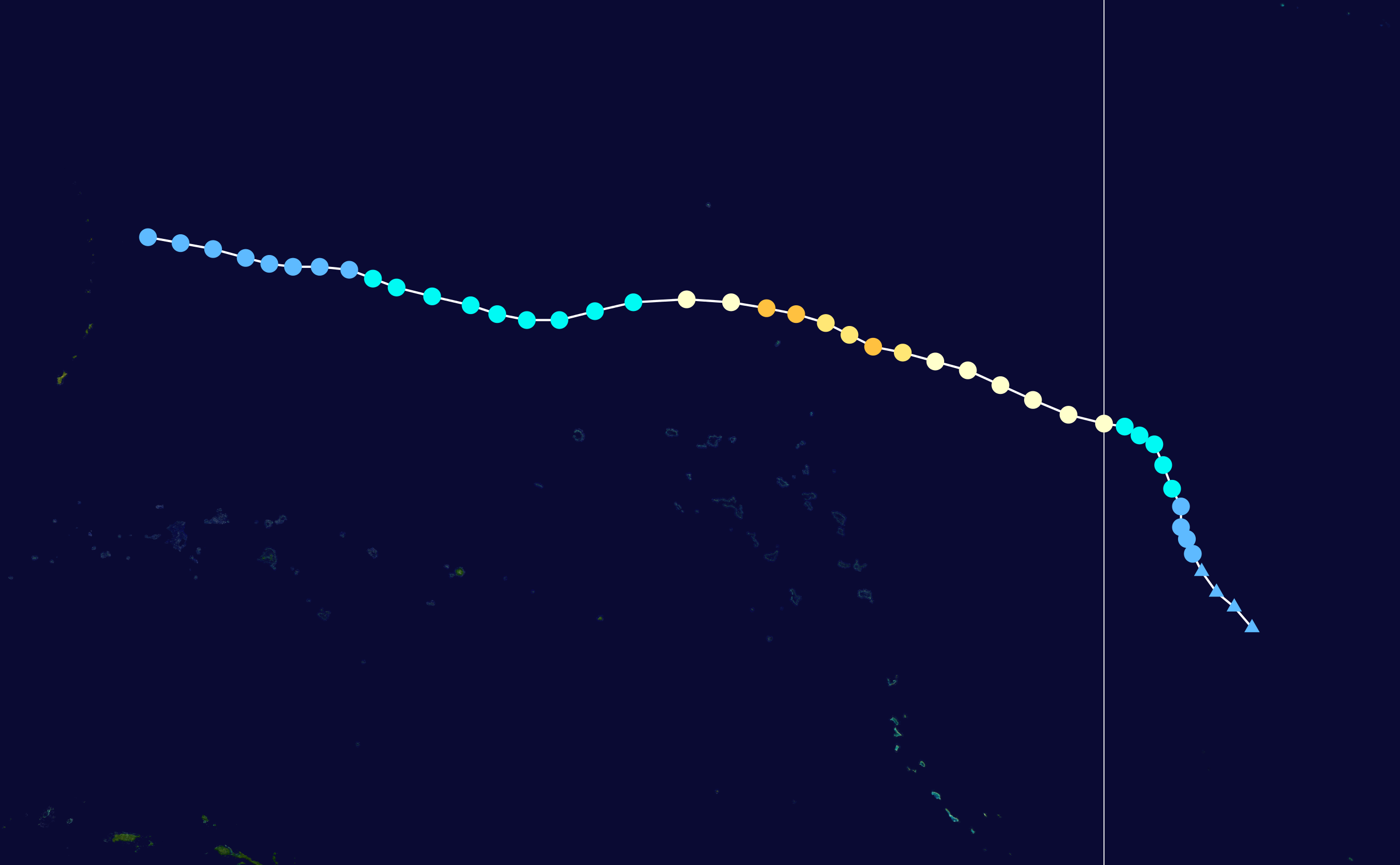
- Duration: November 12 – November 14
- Peak intensity: 80 mph (130 km/h) (1-min);

An area of enhanced convection in the ITCZ close to the equator formed into a tropical depression on November 11. It headed north northwest, and intensified into Tropical Storm Ruby on November 13. Ruby then abruptly turned west and crossed the dateline, briefly reaching hurricane status. After becoming a typhoon just after crossing the dateline, the first time that had happened since 1967, Ruby steadily strengthened and eventually peaked as a moderately intense typhoon on November 16 while east of Taongi Atoll. It then steadily weakened as it headed west northwest, and wind shear destroyed the cyclone on November 20 when it was east of the Northern Marianas Islands. Ruby caused no deaths or damage. Of note is the fact that on November 17, Ruby had a central pressure of 983 mb (983 hPa), which is high for a 100-knot typhoon.

=== Tropical Storm Liza ===
- Tropical storm (SSHWS)
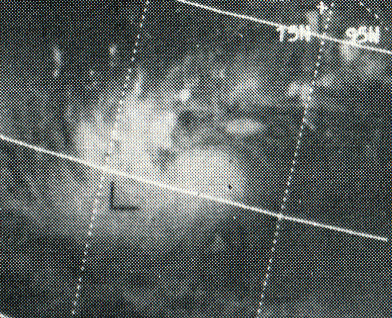
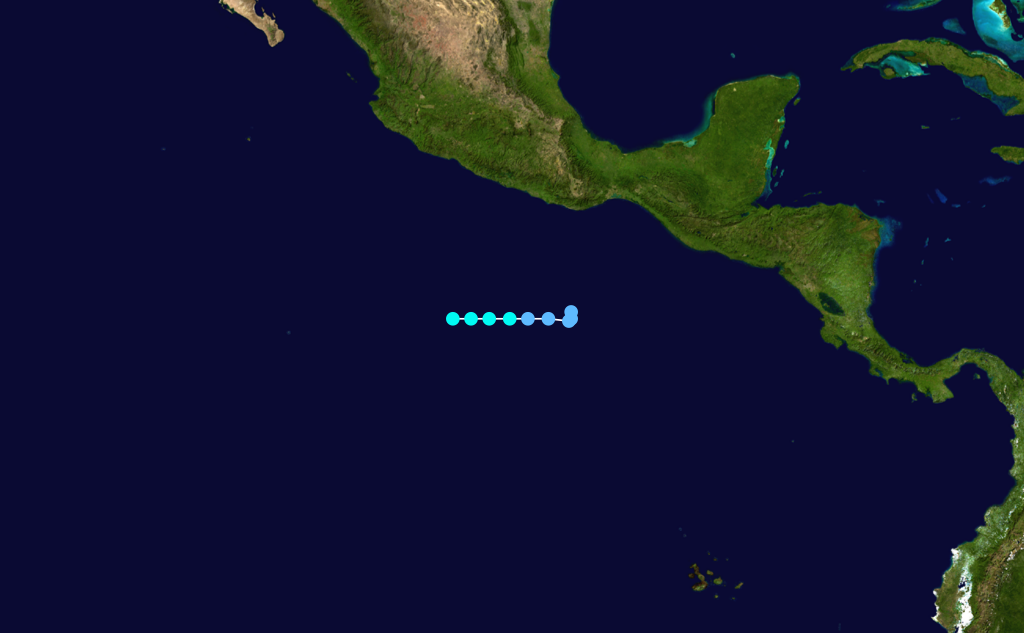
- Duration: November 13 – November 15
- Peak intensity: 50 mph (85 km/h) (1-min); 1007 mbar (hPa)

A tropical depression formed south of the Gulf of Tehuantepec on November 13. It headed nearly due east and intensified into Tropical Storm Liza on November 14. Liza degenerated into a tropical wave the next day. No deaths or damages were reported. Liza was a tropical storm for less than a day.

=== Tropical Depression Sixteen ===
Tropical Depression Sixteen formed on November 20. It briefly headed north and then turned to the west. It dissipated on November 21.

== Storm names ==
The following list of names was used for named storms that formed in the North Pacific Ocean east of 140°W in 1972. This was the same set of names used for the 1968 season. No names were retired after this season, thus the same list was used again for the 1976 season.

- Annette
- Bonny
- Celeste *
- Diana *
- Estelle
- Fernanda *
- Gwen
- Hyacinth
- Iva
- Joanne
- Kathleen
- Liza
- Madeline (unused)
- Naomi (unused)
- Orla (unused)
- Pauline (unused)
- Rebecca (unused)
- Simone (unused)
- Tara (unused)
- Valerie (unused)
- Willa (unused)

Two named storms, listed below, formed in the North Pacific between 140°W and the International Date Line in 1972. At the time, storm names within this region were assigned by the Joint Typhoon Warning Center on Guam. Named storms in the table above that crossed into the area during the season are noted (*).

- June
- Ruby

== Season effects ==
This is a table of all of the storms that formed in the 1972 Pacific hurricane season. It includes their name, duration, peak classification and intensities, areas affected, damage, and death totals. Deaths in parentheses are additional and indirect (an example of an indirect death would be a traffic accident), but were still related to that storm. Damage and deaths include totals while the storm was extratropical, a wave, or a low, and all of the damage figures are in 1972 USD.

Saffir–Simpson scale
TD	TS	C1	C2	C3	C4	C5

1973 Pacific hurricane season statistics
Storm name	Dates active	Storm category at peak intensity	Max 1-min wind mph (km/h)	Min. press. (mbar)	Areas affected	Damage (US$)	Deaths	Ref(s).
Annette	June 1–8	Category 1 hurricane	85 (140)	993	Mexico	None	0	
Two	June 27–28	Tropical depression	35 (55)	Unknown	None	None	0	
Three	July 4–6	Tropical depression	35 (55)	Unknown	None	None	0	
Bonny	July 27–30	Tropical storm	50 (85)	993	None	None	0	
Celeste	August 6–22	Category 4 hurricane	130 (215)	940	Hawaii, Johnston Atoll	Unknown	0	
Diana	August 11–20	Category 2 hurricane	110 (175)	968	Hawaii	0.072	0	
Estelle	August 15–22	Category 1 hurricane	80 (130)	1004	None	None	0	
Fernanda	August 20 – September 1	Category 3 hurricane	115 (185)	948	Hawaii	None	0	
Gwen	August 22–31	Category 3 hurricane	125 (205)	941	None	None	0	
Hyacinth	August 28 – September 7	Category 3 hurricane	125 (205)	962	California	None	0	
Iva	September 14–22	Tropical storm	50 (85)	999	None	None	0	
June	September 24–28	Tropical storm	60 (95)	Unknown	None	None	0	
Unnamed	September 28 – October 3	Tropical depression	35 (55)	Unknown	Hawaii	None	0	
Joanne	September 30 – October 7	Category 2 hurricane	100 (155)	971	Mexico, California, Arizona	Unknown	(1)	
Thirteen	October 12–18	Tropical depression	35 (55)	Unknown	None	None	0	
Kathleen	October 18–19	Tropical storm	45 (75)	Unknown	None	None	0	
Olga	October 19	Tropical depression	35 (55)	Unknown	None	None	0	
Ruby	November 12–14	Category 1 hurricane	80 (130)	983	None	None	0	
Liza	November 13–15	Tropical storm	50 (85)	1007	None	None	0	
Sixteen	November 20–21	Tropical depression	35 (55)	Unknown	None	None	0	
Season aggregates
20 systems	June 1 – November 20		130 (215)	940	Mexico, Johnston Atoll, California, Arizona, Hawaii	0.072	(1)	

== See also ==
- List of Pacific hurricanes
- Pacific hurricane season
- 1972 Atlantic hurricane season
- 1972 Pacific typhoon season
- 1972 North Indian Ocean cyclone season
- Southern Hemisphere tropical cyclone seasons: 1971–72, 1972–73
