= 1972 North Indian Ocean cyclone season =

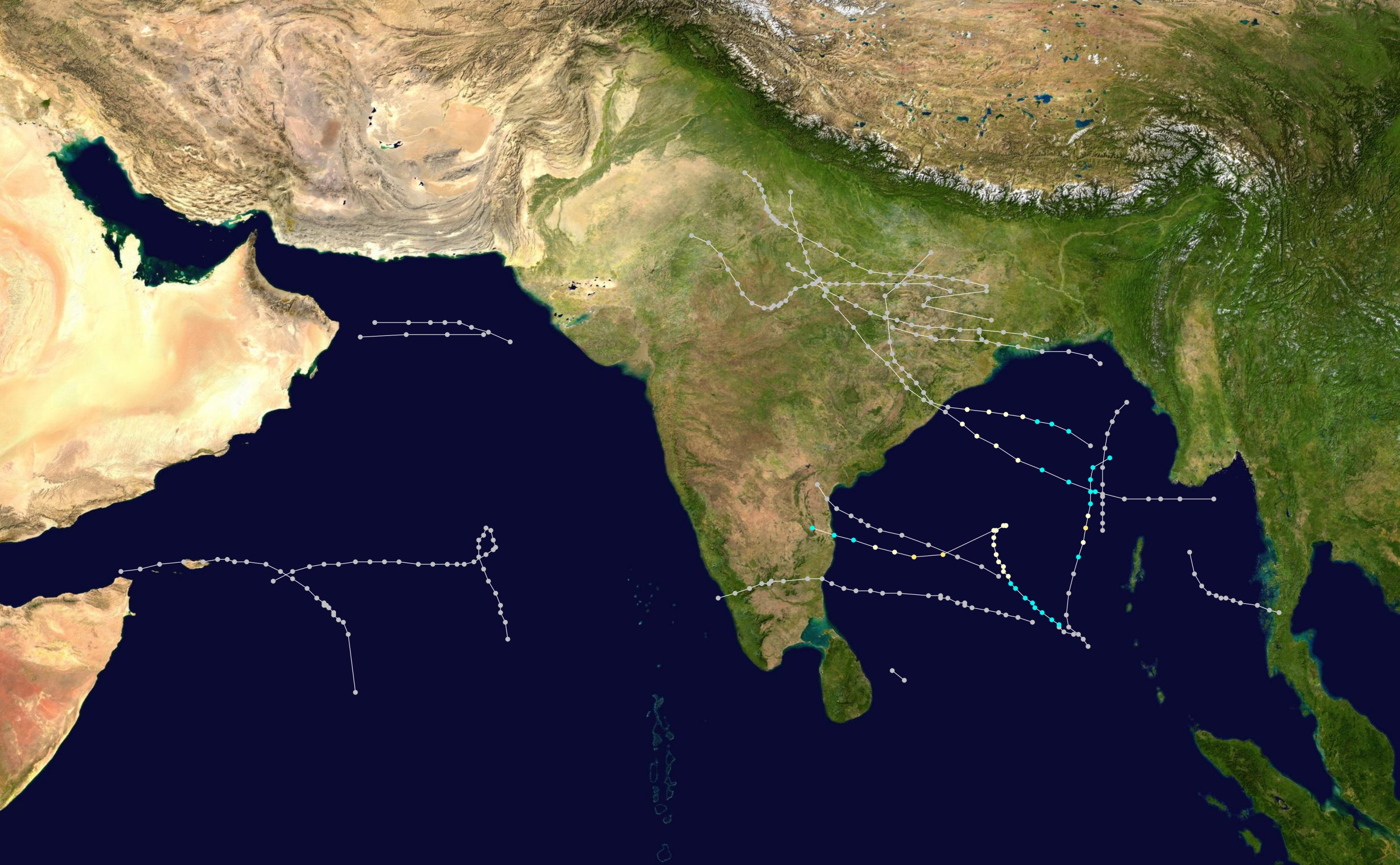
- Season summary map

Seasonal boundaries
- First system formed: April 7,1972
- Last system dissipated: December 8, 1972

Seasonal statistics
- Deep depressions: 18
- Cyclonic storms: 7
- Severe cyclonic storms: 6
- Total fatalities: Unknown
- Total damage: Unknown

Related articles
- 1972 Atlantic hurricane season; 1972 Pacific hurricane season; 1972 Pacific typhoon season

The 1972 North Indian Ocean cyclone season was part of the annual cycle of tropical cyclone formation. The season had no official bounds, but cyclones tend to form between April and December. These dates conventionally delimit the period of each year when most tropical cyclones form in the northern Indian Ocean. There are two main seas in the North Indian Ocean—the Bay of Bengal to the east of the Indian subcontinent and the Arabian Sea to the west of India. The official Regional Specialized Meteorological Centre in this basin is the India Meteorological Department (IMD), while the Joint Typhoon Warning Center (JTWC) releases unofficial advisories. An average of five tropical cyclones form in the North Indian Ocean every season with peaks in May and November. Cyclones occurring between the meridians 45°E and 100°E are included in the season by the IMD.

== Systems ==
=== Severe Cyclonic Storm One (01B) ===
- Severe cyclonic storm (IMD)
- Category 2 tropical cyclone (SSHWS)
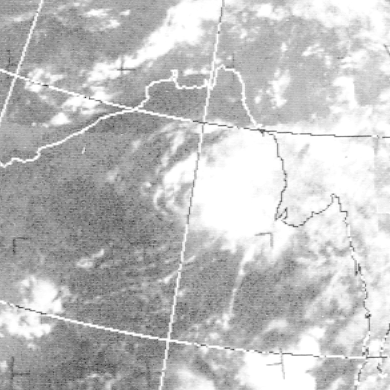
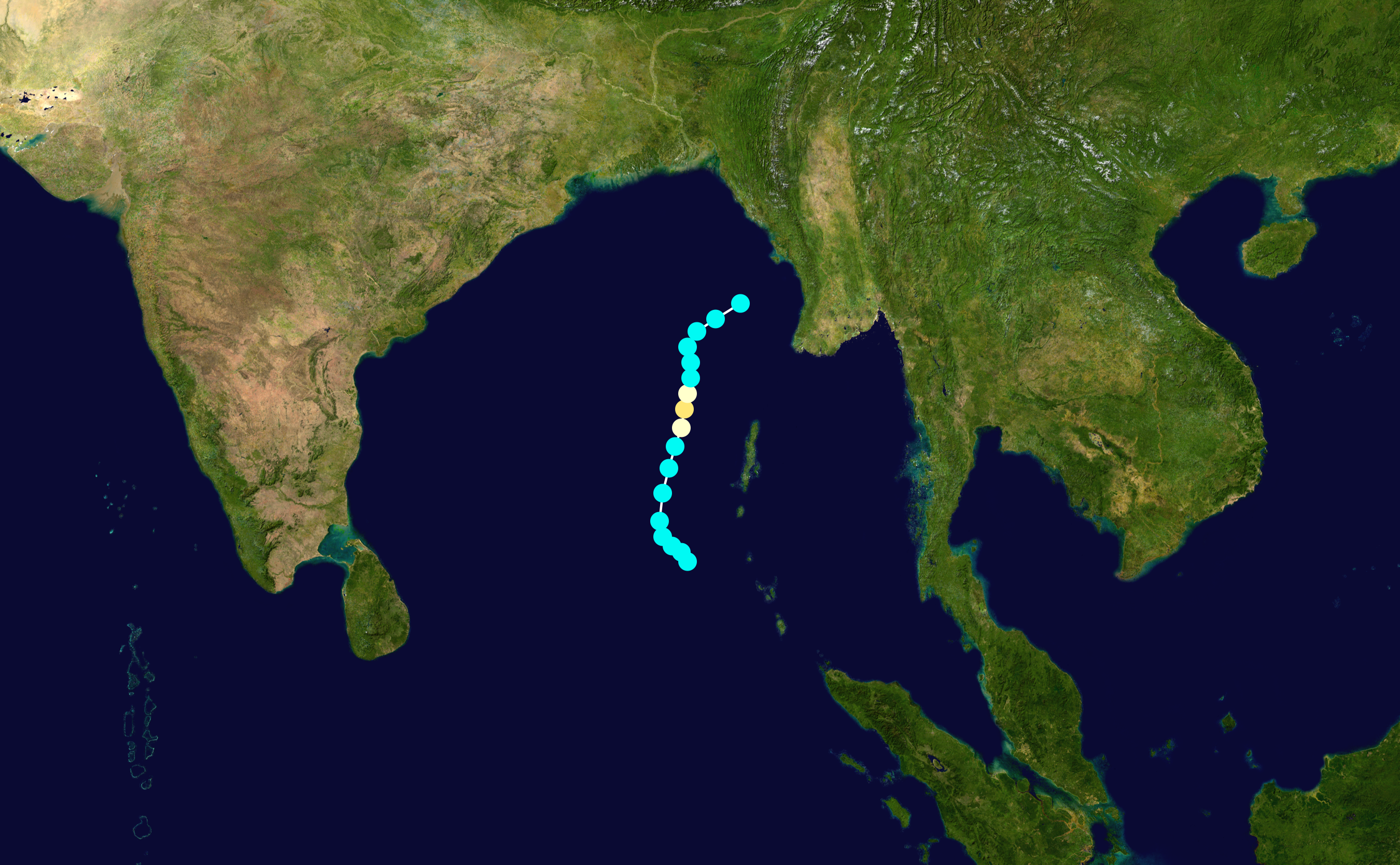
- Duration: April 7 – April 11
- Peak intensity: 100 km/h (65 mph) (3-min);

=== Depression Five (05B) ===
- Depression (IMD)
- Tropical storm (SSHWS)
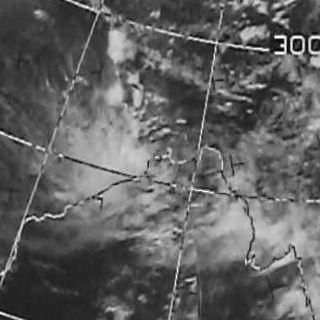
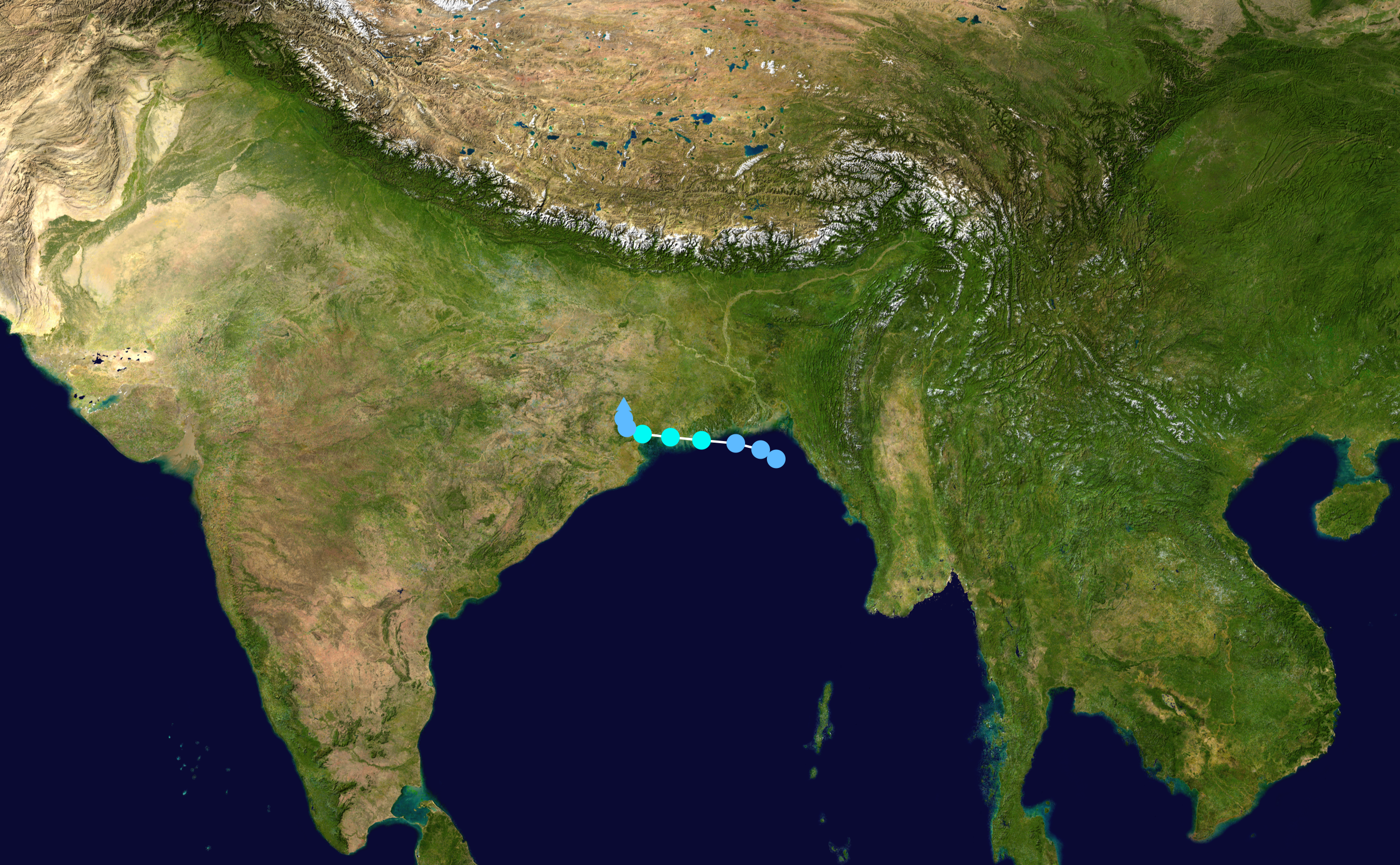
- Duration: July 13 – July 15
- Peak intensity: 45 km/h (30 mph) (3-min);

=== Extremely Severe Cyclonic Storm Nine (09B) ===
- Extremely severe cyclonic storm (IMD)
- Category 1 tropical cyclone (SSHWS)
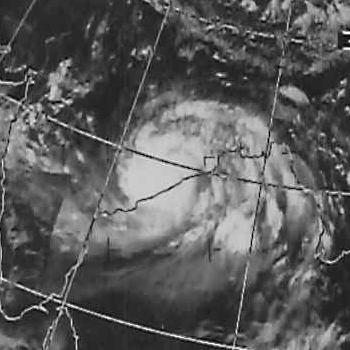
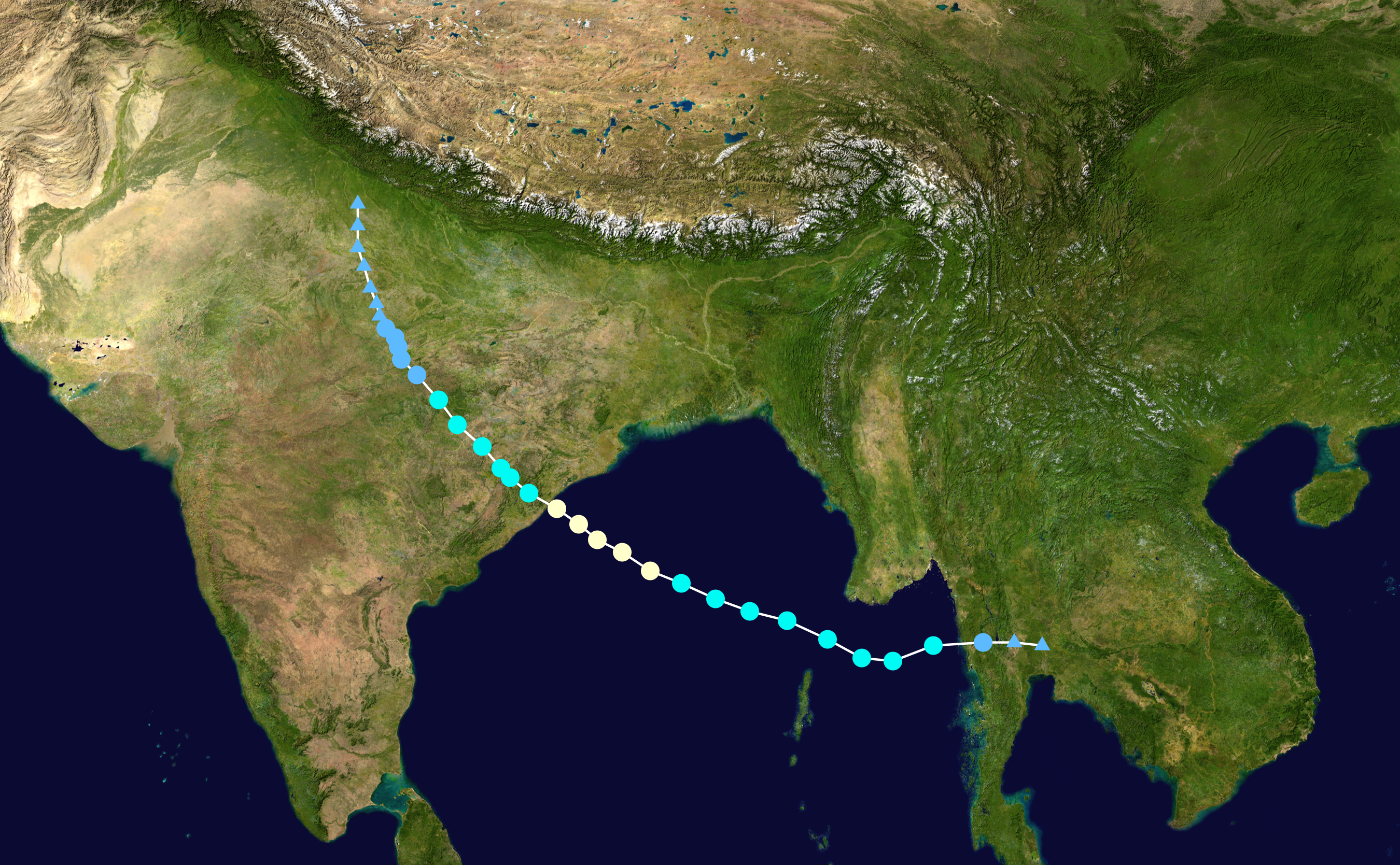
- Duration: September 7 – September 14
- Peak intensity: 175 km/h (110 mph) (3-min);

This storm was formed on 7 September, possibly due to the remnants of Typhoon Elsie in the West Pacific. It gradually intensified to a Very Severe Cyclonic Storm by 9 September. The storm made landfall at Ichhapuram in Andhra Pradesh on 10 September. Due to the storm, 100 people and 8000 cattle perished. Puri in Odisha recorded gust winds up to 185 km/h (115 mph). Heavy damages to agricultural crops took place at Odisha and Andhra Pradesh. Nearly 2 lakh people were affected by the storm. Ganjam District in Odisha was the worst affected by the storm. It was one of the most intense cyclones to hit India in the month of September.

=== Very Severe Cyclonic Storm Ten (10B) ===
- Very severe cyclonic storm (IMD)
- Category 1 tropical cyclone (SSHWS)
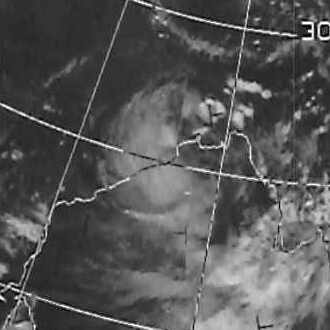
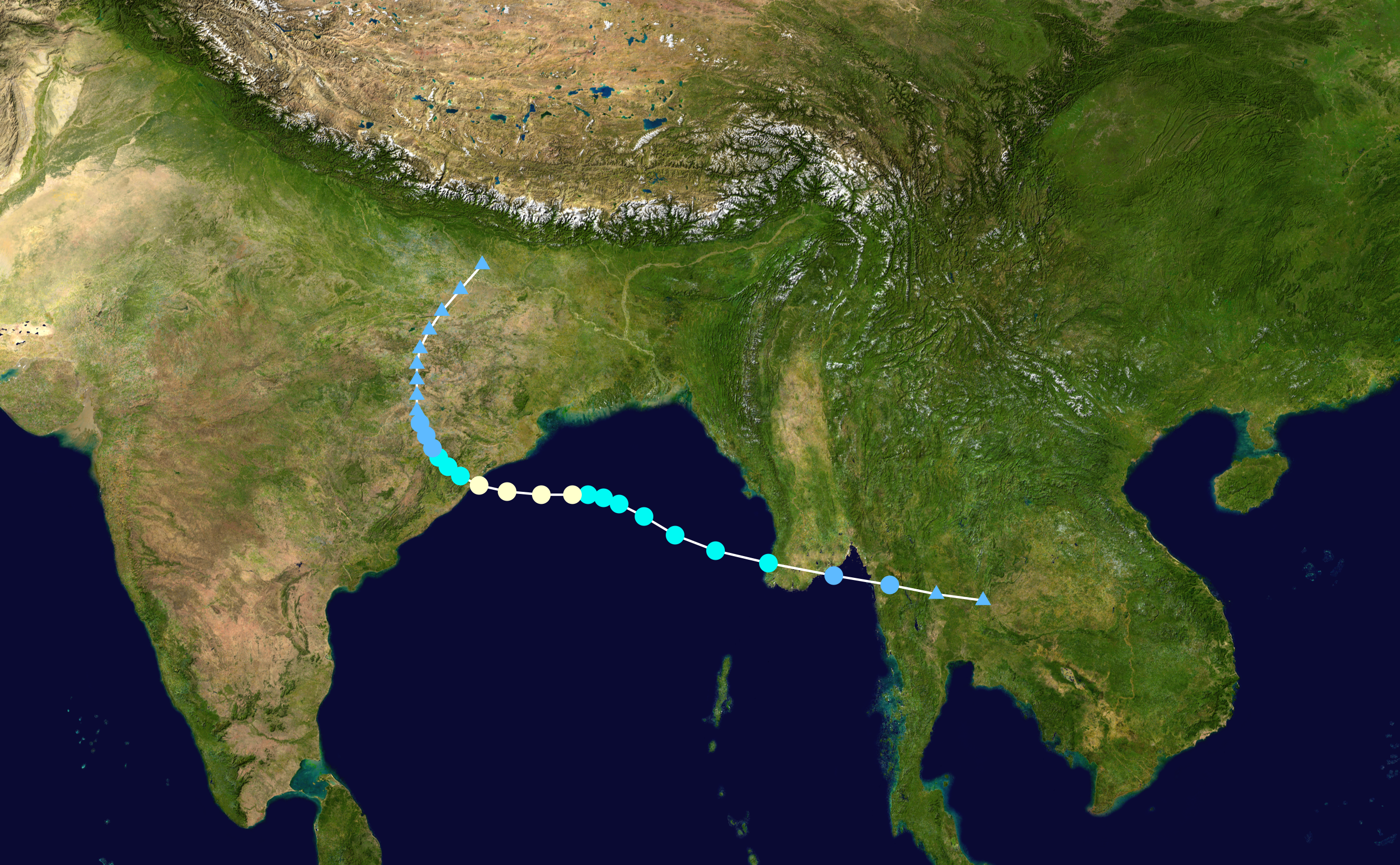
- Duration: September 20 – September 25
- Peak intensity: 140 km/h (85 mph) (3-min);

This cyclone was formed on 20 September and intensified to a Very Severe Cyclonic Storm despite being present over the upwelled waters due to Cyclone 09B. It made landfall at Gopalpur in Odisha on 22 September and dissipated by the next day. Wind gusts of up to 140 km/h (85 mph) were recorded at the time of landfall. Despite severe damage to crops and houses, no deaths due to the storm were reported.

=== Cyclonic Storm Twelve (12A) ===
- Cyclonic storm (IMD)
- Category 1 tropical cyclone (SSHWS)
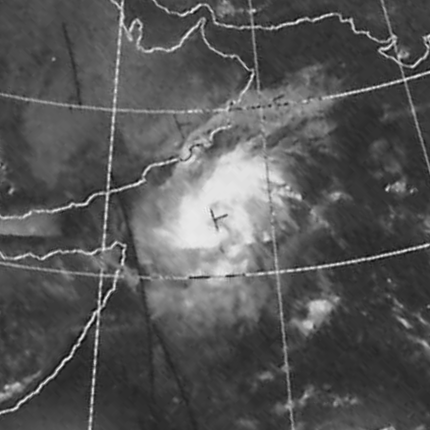
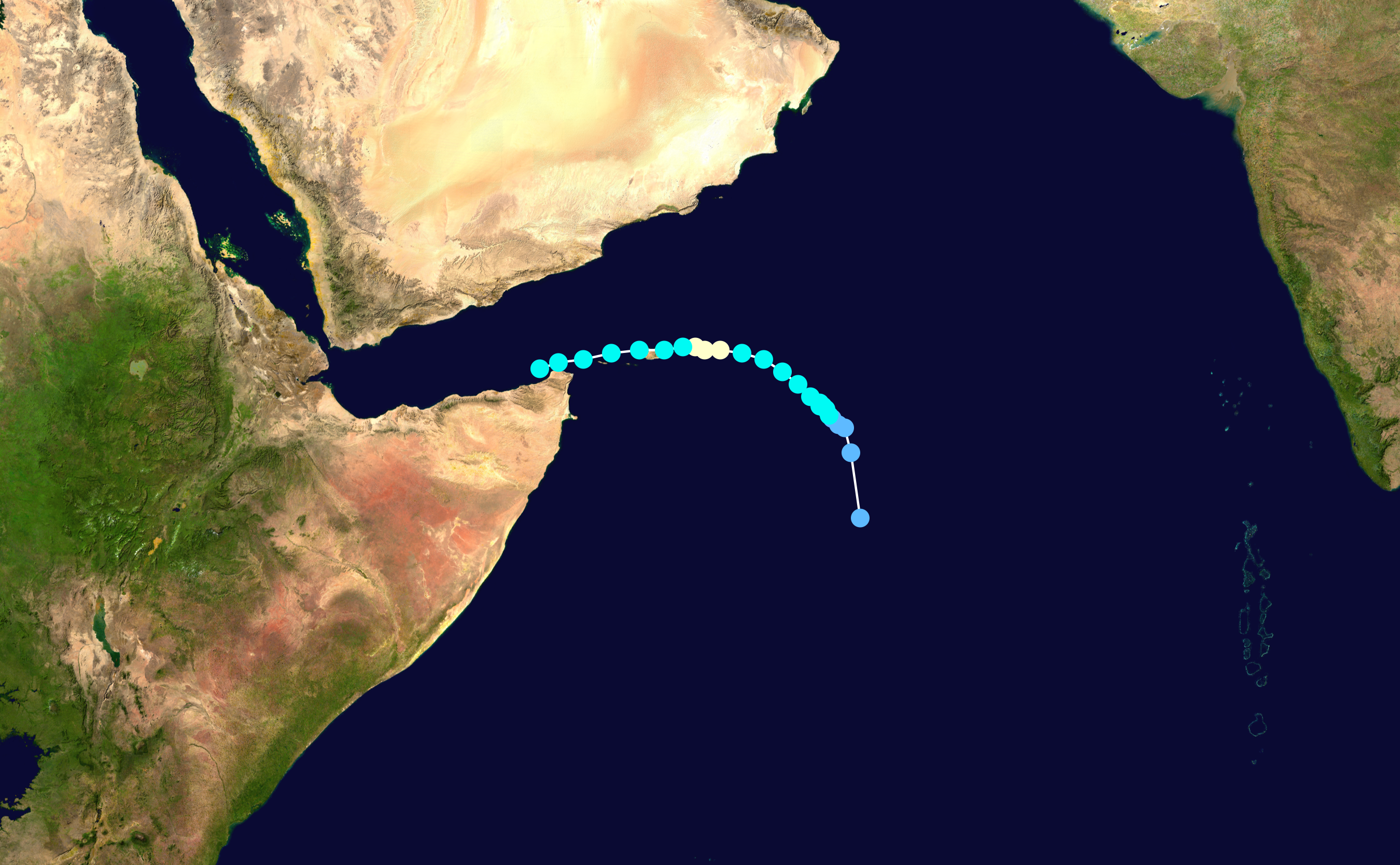
- Duration: October 19 – October 25
- Peak intensity: 85 km/h (50 mph) (3-min);

=== Severe Cyclonic Storm Fourteen (14B) ===
- Severe cyclonic storm (IMD)
- Category 2 tropical cyclone (SSHWS)
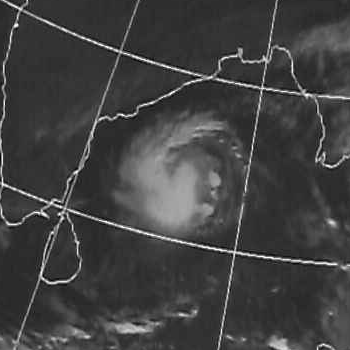
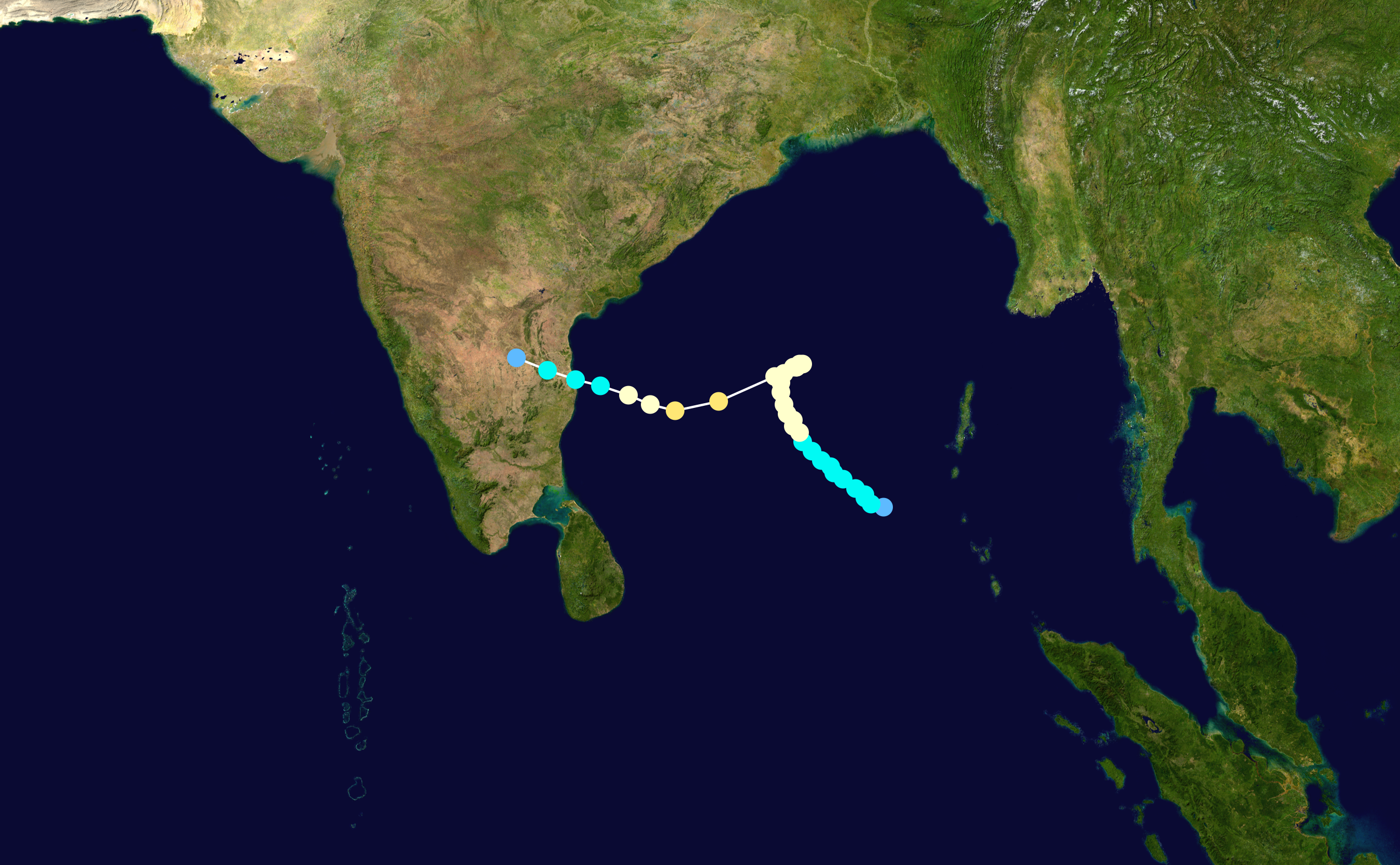
- Duration: November 15 – November 23
- Peak intensity: 110 km/h (70 mph) (3-min); 983 hPa (mbar)

This cyclone was formed on 15 November and gradually intensified to a Severe Cyclonic Storm. After making an erratic loop, the storm made landfall at Sriharikota on 22 November. The lowest pressure was 983 hPa/millibars (29.0 inches) and wind gusts of up to 165 km/h (105 mph) were measured by the ship ATAF. 80 people were reportedly killed due to the storm. Several trees were uprooted and thousands of people were rendered homeless.

=== Very Severe Cyclonic Storm Sixteen (16B) ===
- Very severe cyclonic storm (IMD)
- Category 1 tropical cyclone (SSHWS)
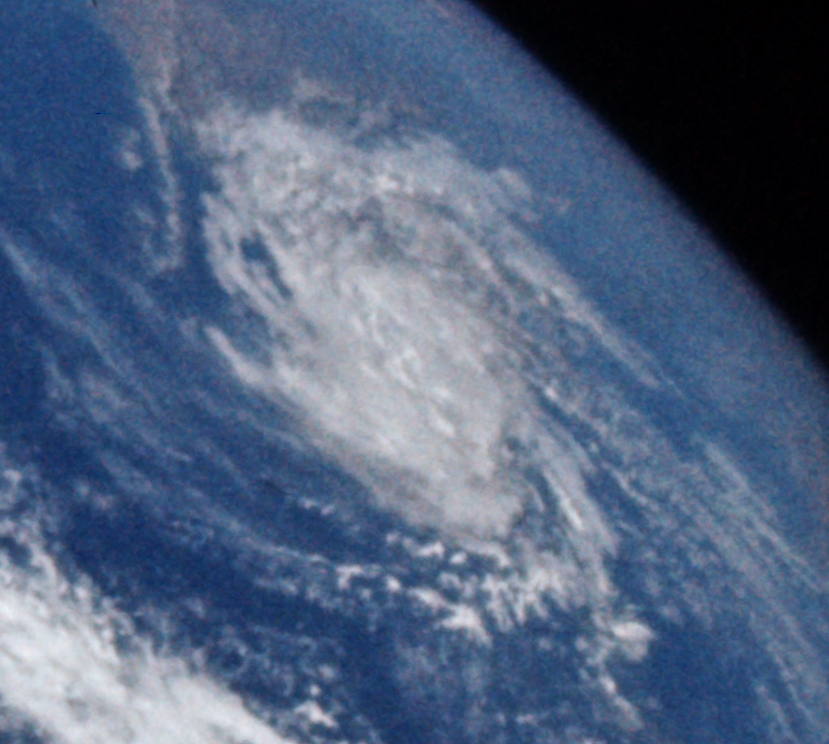
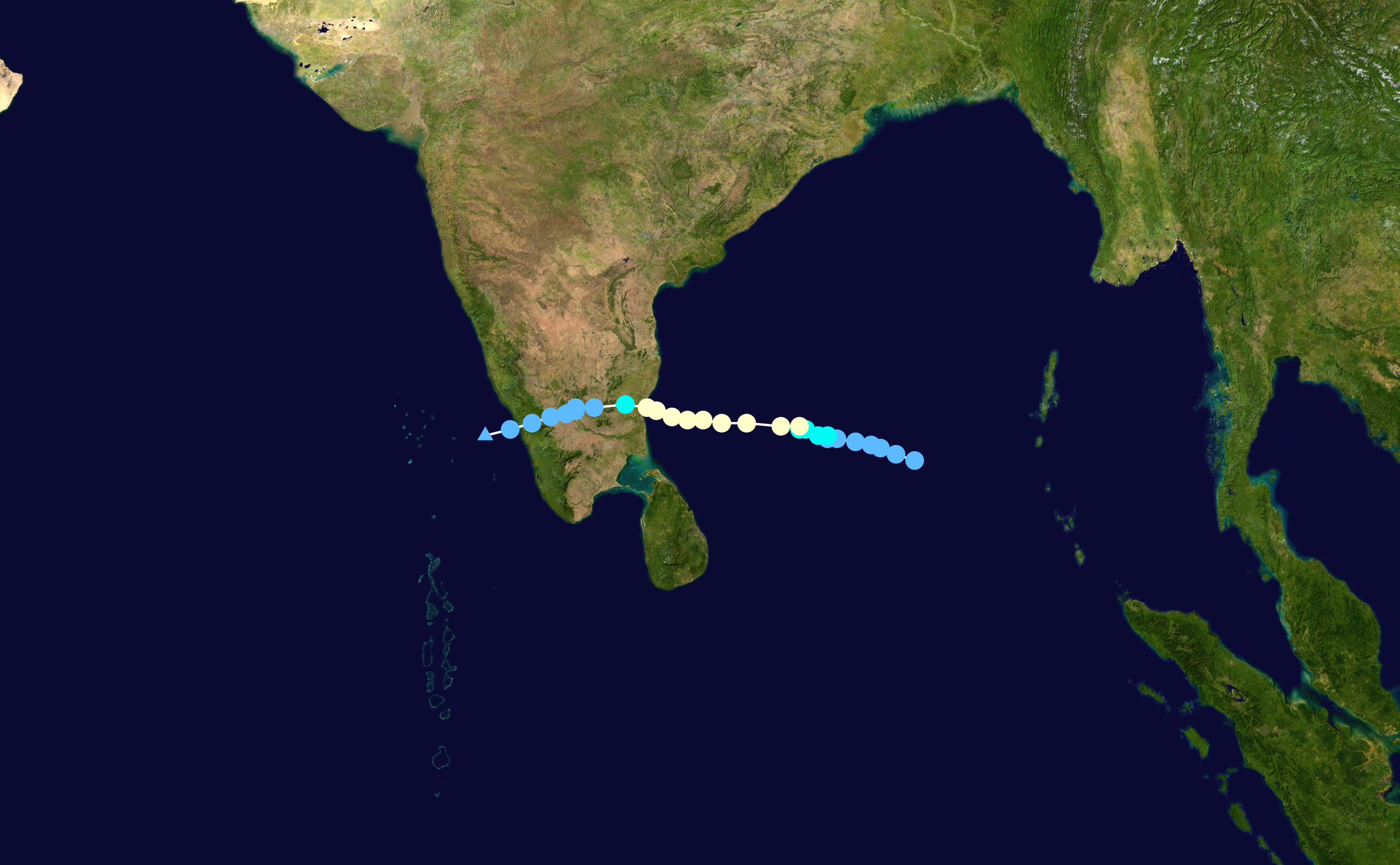
- Duration: December 1 – December 8
- Peak intensity: 155 km/h (100 mph) (3-min);

This storm killed 80 people and 150 cattle. 30,000 people were rendered homeless. Cuddalore recorded gust winds up to 150 km/h (95 mph) at the time of landfall. Total damages in Indian Rupees were estimated to be 40 crores. The cyclone is visible on the famous The Blue Marble photo taken by Harrison Schmitt on Apollo 17.

== See also ==
- North Indian Ocean tropical cyclone
- 1972 Atlantic hurricane season
- 1972 Pacific hurricane season
- 1972 Pacific typhoon season
- Australian cyclone seasons: 1971–72, 1972–73
- South Pacific cyclone seasons: 1971–72, 1972–73
- South-West Indian Ocean cyclone seasons: 1971–72, 1972–73
