= List of storms named Celeste =

The name Celeste has been used for five tropical cyclones worldwide, four in the East Pacific Ocean and one in the Australian region of the South Pacific.

In the East Pacific:

- Hurricane Celeste (1960) – developed from the remnants of Atlantic Basin Hurricane Abby; did not make landfall.
- Tropical Storm Celeste (1968) – did not make landfall.
- Hurricane Celeste (1972) – a long-lived Category 4 hurricane that made landfall on Johnston Atoll.
- Tropical Storm Celeste (1976) – remained in the open ocean.

In the Australian region:

- Cyclone Celeste (1996) – formed in the Coral Sea and rapidly intensified into a Category 3 severe tropical cyclone (Australian scale); approached Bowen, Queensland, before moving back out to sea.
