= Regina Maris (1908) =

American sailing ship

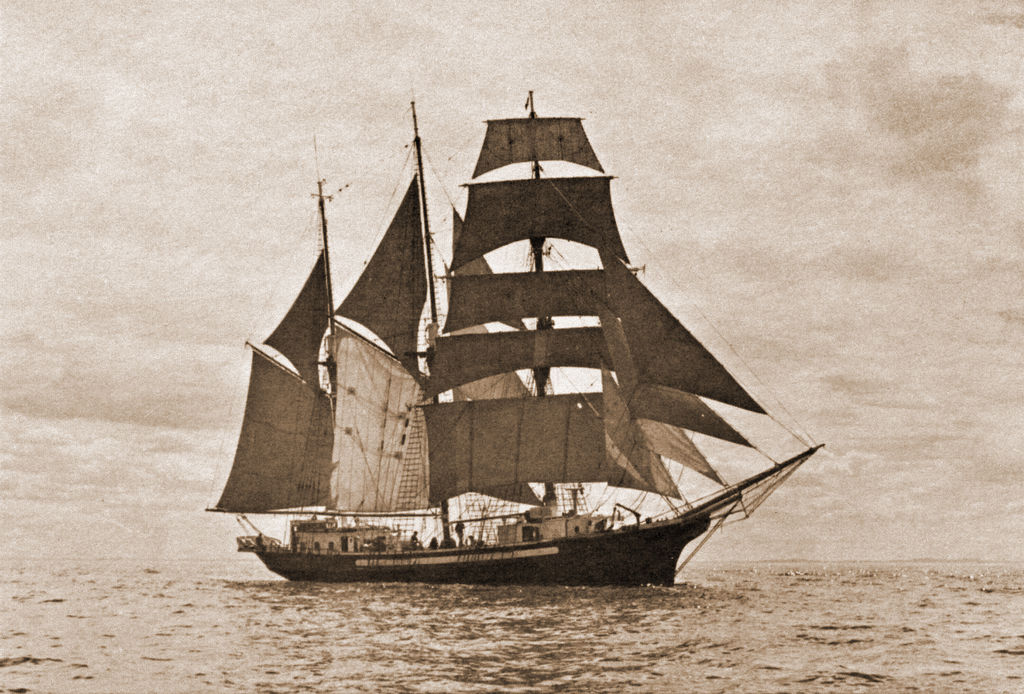

History

United States
- Name: Regina (1908–1962) "Regina Maris" (1965-2017)
- Builder: J. Ring-Andersen, Svendborg, Denmark
- Launched: 1908
- Out of service: 1962–63, 1985–1998
- Renamed: Regina Maris (1963)
- Fate: Sank in I harbor at Glen Cove, New York 1998 and destroyed in 2017.

General characteristics
- Tons burthen: 210 tons
- Length: 144 ft (44 m) over all
- Beam: 24 ft 11 in (7.59 m)
- Draft: 10 ft 10 in (3.30 m)
- Propulsion: 350-hp Busch-Sulzer diesel, single screw
- Sail plan: 3-mast Schooner 1908-1962; Barquentine 1963-1998; 5,920 sf of sail as barq. (550 m^{2})
- Speed: 11 knots, combined sail & power
- Complement: 9 prof. crew + 22 students (1980s)

The American sailing ship Regina Maris was originally built as the three-masted topsail schooner Regina in 1908. She was a 144-foot (44-meter), wooden, completely fore-and-aft–rigged sailing ship with three masts. She was re-rigged in 1963 as a 148-foot (45-meter) barquentine. Regina Maris could reach a speed of up to 12 knots, especially on a half-wind course or with a fresh back-stay breeze.

== Description ==
Her original home port was Amsterdam. Her classification was SI Z1234+, EU 98/18. Her length overall was 48 meters (157 feet). Her beam was 6.90 meters (22.6 feet), with a draught of 2.80 meters (9.2 feet). Her masthead height was 29.00 meters (95.14 feet). Her displacement was 280 tons with a gross tonnage of 153 tons. She was rigged as a three-masted topsail schooner with a sail area of 720 m^{2} (7,800 ft^{2}) across 11 sails.

Her main engine was an eight-cylinder Caterpillar 3408 that produced 365 hp (272 kW). Her generators were a Mitsubishi 15 kW and a Lister Petter at 20 kW. Her bunker capacity for gas and oil was 12,000 liters (3,170 U.S. gallons; 2,640 Imperial gallons). Her bunker capacity for fresh water was 16,000 liters (4,227 U.S. gallons; 3,520 Imperial gallons).

Her speed under sail was 12 knots and under engine was 9 knots. Her passenger capacity was up to 80 passengers for short-term voyages and 36 passengers for overnight voyages. She had two two-passenger and eight four-passenger cabins.

== History ==
Regina was built as a three masted schooner with 12 fore and aft-rigged sails plus two square sails mounted to yardarms on the foremast. She was designed to ply the Baltic Sea with general trade goods, fuel oil in metal tins, fish products and lumber. She never carried nitrates contrary to rumor. The keel was laid March 15, 1907, on the shipyards 40th birthday. Since the Regina was to be the 100th hull produced by the shipyard of J. Ring Anderson in Svendborg, Denmark she was named after the Jorgen Ring-Anderson's wife. When Regina was launched on March 28, 1908, the ships hull was painted white and her masts were stepped and flags were flying. As she started down the ways, the launching cradle collapsed throwing her on her side but landed upright and undamaged. Regina was built for Captain Olof Bengtsson of Raa, Sweden.

In 1914, she had a collision with a Norwegian steamboat that caused an early haul-out and layup for repairs.

On 15 February 1920, Regina was discovered abandoned in the North Sea. Her crew was rescued by the Swedish steamer Fritiof. Regina was towed into IJmuiden, North Holland, Netherland by the Dutch fishing trawler Eendracht II.

The Regina was sold on February 19, 1932, to Captain Gustaf Edvardsson of Skärhamn, Sweden.

Regina at one time was believed to have been involved in the rescue of Danish Jews during World War II, but this was later disproven.

Until 1963, the ship sailed under Swedish colors and was called Regina, rigged as a three-masted topsail running foresail schooner. Following a severe fire in 1963, she was purchased by the Norwegian shipping magnates Siegfried and John Aage Wilson and converted to serve as the latter's private yacht. Rebuilt with a very tall three-masted barquentine rig for this purpose, the ship was renamed Regina Maris ("Queen of the Sea"). Between 1963 and 1984, she was used in many television and movie productions, conducted a global circuits, and underwent stints as a cruise ship, sail training facility, and marine mammal research vessel.

In August 1972, during its initial intensification in the East Pacific, Hurricane Celeste was responsible for damaging the barquentine Regina Maris (schooner) with 58 people aboard which was impacted by high winds and rough seas, resulting in damage that led to the ship taking on 2000 gallons of water an hour. A Hurricane Hunter aircraft en route to the hurricane found the ship after receiving news that it was in the area and helped guide a rescue aircraft to the vessel before resuming its reconnaissance flight. The Vishva Tirth an Indian freighter, was the first vessel to arrive and it towed the Regina Maris to Los Angeles which took about 10 days. The Vishva Tirth took aboard most of the passengers from the Regina Maris. The Captain, Paul Maskell, along with the crew stayed on board the Regina Maris. The US Coast Guard Cutter Mellon arrived the day after the Vishva Tirth took the Regina Maris under tow and escorted both vessels for a few days. The Regina Maris was towed the entire way to Los Angeles by the Vishva Tirth. The towing was affected by Celeste and later by Hurricane Diana. While stranded, two people were treated for injuries on board the vessel.

For a number of years Regina Maris was docked in Boston, Massachusetts and was in the possession of the Ocean Research and Education Society (ORES), a local non-profit organization, captained by Dr. George Nichols. During this time she made voyages to Newfoundland, Labrador, Greenland, and the Caribbean, with crews of about 29 scientists and students, the primary purpose of which was cetacean research, in particular mapping the migration routes of humpback whales. in 1982 Dr. Nichols continued his journey through the Panama Canal and up the West coast to Los Angeles and San Francisco Then returned to Boston. When the organization ran out of money trying to keep Regina seaworthy it is believed that she was sold to Anthony Athanas of Boston's Pier Four restaurant for use as a stationary party ship. One severely cold night with a loud crack she sank.

The vessel was saved from being scuttled by Captain Robert Val Rosenbaum and moved from Boston. Massachusetts, to Greenport, New York, where Rosenbaum founded the Regina Maris Foundation and began a restoration process with 70 local volunteers in 1991. Hurricane Bob hit the east end of Long Island in August 1991, and Captain Rosenbaum scuttled the vessel at her berth to save her from being destroyed by the storm and to prevent the destruction of the nearby historic waterfront buildings. After the storm, the vessel was raised by Captain Rosenbaum and sold for one dollar to facilitate the restoration effort by a newly formed nonprofit organization. During the next eight years the corporation raised money through donations, fund raisers and grants in Greenport to restore the vessel.

The vessel was towed to Glen Cove, New York, in 1998 as part of a plan to revitalize the city's waterfront. Plans to restore the ship were hampered by the discovery that she was not involved in rescuing Jewish refugees in World War II, as well as the economic impact of the September 11 attacks in 2001. The ship was chronically leaky and sank at the dock in 2002. Efforts to raise her in 2003 damaged her beyond repair. The deck, gunnels, deckhouse, bowsprit, masts, and rigging were preserved and set in concrete on the nearby esplanade. In July 2017 the remains were destroyed to make way for a new development. The bowsprit was saved and donated to the Long Island Maritime Museum in West Sayville, New York.

== Timeline ==
- Cargo schooner 1908–1963 (Commercial cargo years)
- Private yacht 1963–1970 (Wilson years)
- Cruise ship 1971–1973
- Sail training and movie Set 1973–1976 (Willoughby years)
- Research 1976–1984 (Ocean Research & Education Society)
- From wharf-side attraction to ship's demise 1985–1990
- Regina Maris Foundation and Hurricane Bob 1991
- Save the Regina Maris (non-profit) 1992–1998

== Regina Maris: 1978 ==
Confusingly, an unrelated 3-masted schooner, of similar size but very different construction and history, built in 1978, also bears the name Regina Maris. As of this edit this newer vessel is registered in The Netherlands and actively being sailed. Her particulars may be found among those vessels participating in Sail Amsterdam 2015.

In October 2019, a group of young environmental activists began a seven-week trip aboard the ship, from the Netherlands to Chile, to attend the COP 25 climate change conference in Santiago. The Sail to the COP activists were sailing in order to avoid the high emissions associated with flying. The project was stymied by the conference's relocation from Santiago to Madrid, several weeks after the ship departed.
