= Hurricane Celeste (1972) =

Category 4 Pacific hurricane in 1972

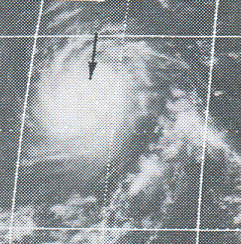
- This ATS 1 weather satellite image of Hurricane Celeste was taken on August 18, 1972

Meteorological history
- Formed: August 6, 1972
- Dissipated: August 22, 1972

Category 4 major hurricane
- 1-minute sustained (SSHWS/NWS)
- Highest winds: 130 mph (215 km/h)
- Lowest pressure: 940 mbar (hPa); 27.76 inHg

Overall effects
- Fatalities: None
- Damage: $3.5 million (1972 USD)
- Areas affected: Hawaii, Johnston Atoll
- IBTrACS
- Part of the 1972 Pacific hurricane season

Hurricane Celeste was a strong Category 4 major hurricane which became the first known tropical cyclone to strike Johnston Atoll as a hurricane. Forming from a disturbance in the East Pacific on August 6, the storm began a general westward movement it would take throughout most of its life. The storm intensified steadily, becoming a Category 1 hurricane on August 10. It kept steady at this intensity until it reached the Central Pacific. Upon entering the Central Pacific, intensification began anew, and by August 14, the hurricane reached a peak intensity of 130 mph (210 km/h). After maintaining this intensity for twelve hours, the hurricane began to weaken while passing south of Hawaii. The weakening phase was similar to its intensification in that the storm lost intensity slowly. Celeste then made a turn to the northwest and dropped below hurricane intensity on August 21. The storm then entered an area of vertical wind shear, causing it to dissipate soon after.

Celeste was responsible for damage to shipping and for causing high waves to hit Hawai'i. The biggest impact from the hurricane, however, was on Johnston Atoll. There, the hurricane caused damage to a meteorology station on the island as well as damaging several military installations, including those related to Program 437, an anti-satellite weapons system. Additionally, there was a threat of contamination on the island from stored Agent Orange and other herbicides brought from Vietnam by the Defense Department for eventual destruction at sea by the Dutch-owned incinerator ship MT Vulcanus. An inspection of the island following the hurricane indicated that there was no contamination, but the 1,800,000 gallons of herbicides sat in steel barrels on salt beaches for nearly 5 years. Overall, damage from the hurricane totalled $3.5 million.

== Meteorological history ==
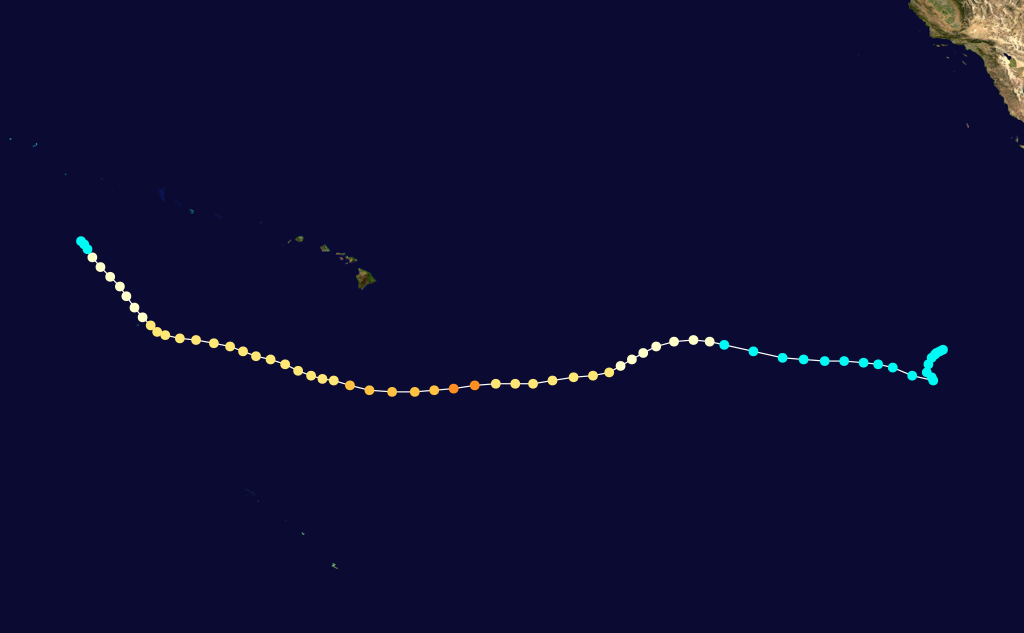
Map plotting the storm's track and intensity, according to the Saffir–Simpson scale Map key Saffir–Simpson scale Tropical depression (≤38 mph, ≤62 km/h) Tropical storm (39–73 mph, 63–118 km/h) Category 1 (74–95 mph, 119–153 km/h) Category 2 (96–110 mph, 154–177 km/h) Category 3 (111–129 mph, 178–208 km/h) Category 4 (130–156 mph, 209–251 km/h) Category 5 (≥157 mph, ≥252 km/h) Unknown Storm type Tropical cyclone Subtropical cyclone Extratropical cyclone, remnant low, tropical disturbance, or monsoon depression

The precursor to Celeste was a tropical disturbance that had stalled roughly 520 miles (840 km) south of La Paz, Mexico on August 4, though the disturbance was tracked starting two days before. The disturbance slowly intensified into a tropical storm on August 6 and was given the name Celeste. The next day, a ship called the Star Track reported winds of 25 mph (40 km/h) and an atmospheric pressure of 1,006 millibars (29.7 inHg) at a point 105 miles (169 km) south of the center of the storm. At this point, the storm began a general westward motion it would continue on for most of its life due to high-pressure areas north of its track. While traversing the East Pacific, the storm kept a consistent intensity until late on August 9, when it started intensifying again, becoming a hurricane the next day. On August 12, the hurricane passed 140°W longitude and entered the Central Pacific just as it reached Category 2 strength.

Upon entering the Central Pacific, the hurricane began intensifying at a steady rate. On August 14, it peaked as a minimum Category 4 hurricane, an intensity it would keep for twelve hours. Afterwards, the hurricane began a slow weakening trend, despite reaching its lowest pressure – 940 millibars (28 inHg) – after its wind speeds decreased. On August 16, the hurricane made a turn to the west-northwest, which brought it on a path towards Johnston Atoll. The hurricane passed 30 miles (48 km) to the northeast of Johnston on August 19, subjecting the atoll to nearly six hours of hurricane-force winds. After passing the atoll, Celeste turned to the northwest and eventually weakened to a tropical storm on August 21. Shortly after weakening to a tropical storm, it entered an area of higher vertical wind shear which ultimately led to its dissipation by August 22.

The best track intensity of Celeste largely varies between the HURDAT and the Central Pacific Hurricane Center (CPHC). The best track on HURDAT lists Celeste as strengthening in intensity from tropical storm to its Category 4 peak and then weakening to dissipation in a straightforward manner, skipping Category 3 intensity while strengthening. The CPHC track, however, varies in that it shows a weakening to Category 1 shortly after entering the basin, followed by reintensification into a Category 3. Another difference is that the CPHC shows Celeste as having reached Category 3 a second time on August 18 after prior weakening, during which it reached its peak intensity. Finally, the CPHC best track gives a peak intensity of Category 3 rather than Category 4.

== Impact ==
During its initial intensification in the East Pacific, Celeste was responsible for damaging a ship in the area. The ship, the barquentine Regina Maris (schooner) with 58 people aboard was impacted by high winds and rough seas, resulting in damage that led to the ship taking on 2000 gallons of water an hour. A Hurricane Hunter aircraft en route to the hurricane found the ship after receiving news that it was in the area and helped guide a rescue aircraft to the vessel before resuming its reconnaissance flight. The Vishva Tirth an Indian freighter, was the first vessel to arrive and it towed the Regina Maris to Los Angeles which took about 10 days. The Vishva Tirth took aboard most of the passengers from the Regina Maris. The Captain, Paul Maskell, along with the crew stayed on board the Regina Maris. The US Coast Guard Cutter Mellon arrived the day after the Vishva Tirth took the Regina Maris under tow and escorted both vessels for a few days. The Regina Maris was towed the entire way to Los Angeles by the Vishva Tirth. The towing was affected by Celeste and later by Hurricane Diana. While stranded, two people were treated for injuries on board the vessel. Another rescue attempt was affected when a homemade yacht called the Little Ark was briefly threatened by the hurricane. Prior to Celeste, it had rescued the crew of the ship Pipedream II, which had been damaged 700 miles (1,100 km) off the coast of California. However, the Coast Guard reported that the yacht would have little trouble in avoiding the hurricane. While passing south of Hawaii, the hurricane affected the Puna, Kau, and South Kona Coasts of the Big Island with waves measuring 15 feet (4.6 m) high. In addition, the threat of swells caused high surf warnings to be posted for the entire Hawaiian chain.

The worst impact was on Johnston Island, which had never experienced a hurricane prior to Celeste. The year before, 13,000 tons of nerve gas and mustard gas had been transferred to the atoll from Okinawa. After a hurricane watch was posted, the idea of evacuation was considered and a decision was to be reached the day before the storm was to arrive. However, the threat of the stored gas being dispersed led to the island being evacuated as a precaution. The need of evacuation was increased by the hurricane gaining speed towards the island. After the decision, the arsenal on the island was secured and most of the personnel on the island were evacuated to Honolulu. Initially, ten people, including the base commander, volunteered to stay behind in shelters in order to clear the runway using bulldozers after the hurricane passed. However, the ten volunteers were evacuated after the risk was found to be too great. During the hurricane, the island was hit by high winds and 45 feet (14 m) waves for six hours, although fears that the island would be inundated never materialized. A total rainfall of 6.21 inches (158 mm) was measured, but this is likely lower than the actual total since the instrument measuring the rainfall was partially clogged by a piece of coral. After the storm had passed, a flight had reported that damage looked minor. A decontamination team then arrived at the island to inspect whether any gas had escaped and whether the runway was usable. The unit later reported that the island was all clear. The north and northwest sides of structures on the island were reported to be hit by a combination of sand and coral. Roofs were blown off and the weather station on the island had lost one third of its roof and ceiling tiles, but the interior and instruments remained intact. None of the vehicles and heavy equipment on the island were reported to have been moved by the storm. An inspection by UNIVAC indicated that several computers on the island incurred rust, corrosion and, in one case, fungal growth. The biggest impact was to Program 437, a defense project that used anti-satellite weapons, with facilities and guidance computers destroyed. The system was repaired but Program 437 was terminated shortly afterwards on 6 March 1975. During Hurricane Keli in 1984, a figure of $3.5 million in damage was reported as having been caused by Celeste.

=== Records ===
In addition to being the first hurricane to strike Johnston, Celeste set many other records while active, most of them related to its impact on Johnston. The evacuations marked the first time that a major U.S. base was left unmanned, although the base was still under surveillance. Following the storm, the weather station on the island measured a wind speed of 105 mph (169 km/h), the highest recorded in 13 years of measurements, besting the previous record of 49 mph (79 km/h) recorded on two occasions. However, the gust recorder at the station remained inactive during the storm. The station also recorded a record low pressure of 983 millibars (29.0 inHg). The previous lowest was 1,003 millibars (29.6 inHg) at an unknown time.

== See also ==
- List of Pacific hurricanes
- List of Category 4 Pacific hurricanes
- Other tropical cyclones of the same name
