= 1972–73 South-West Indian Ocean cyclone season =

Cyclone season in the Southwest Indian Ocean

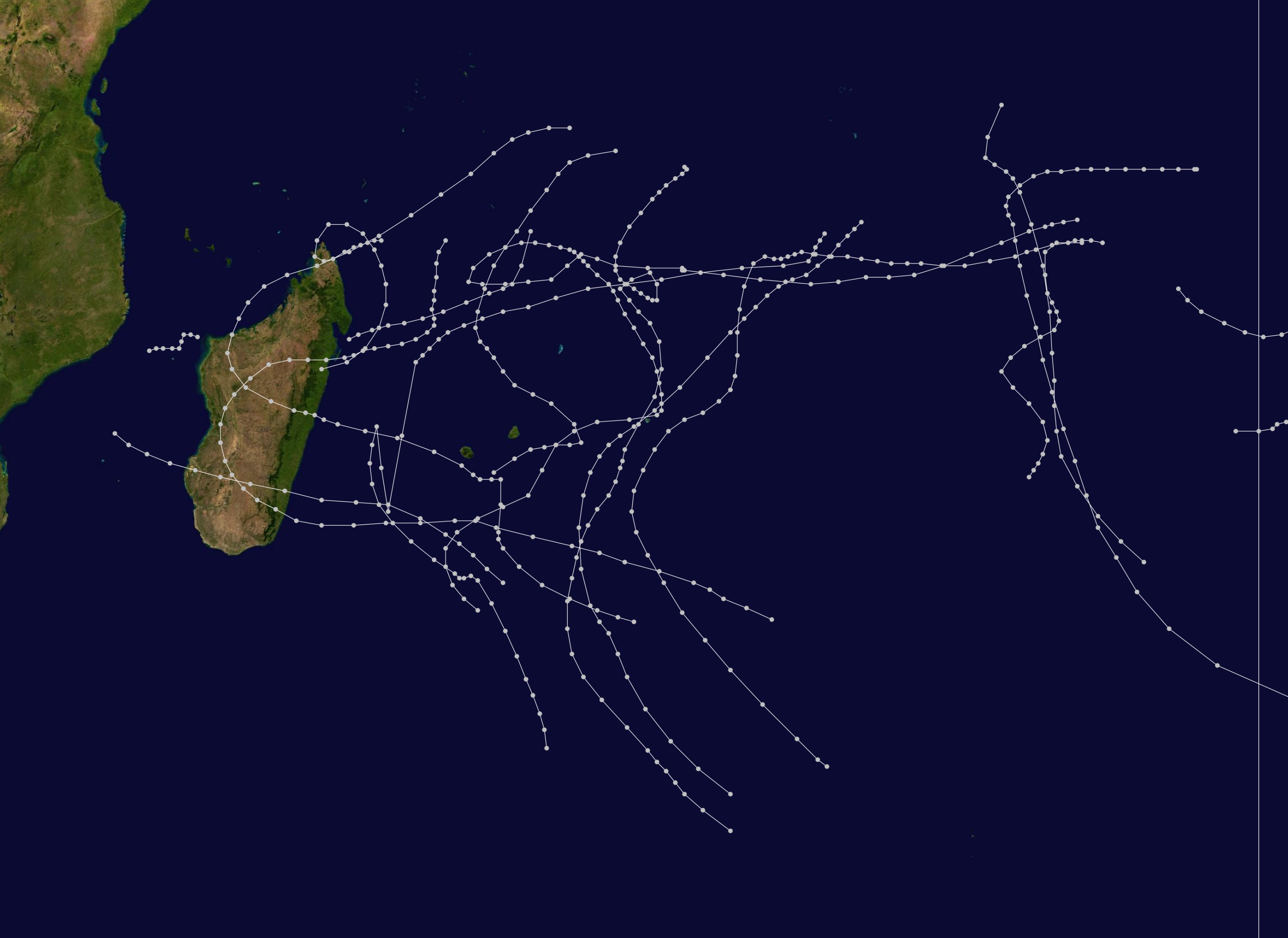
- Season summary map

Seasonal boundaries
- First system formed: 26 November 1972
- Last system dissipated: 3 May 1973

Strongest storm
- Name: Lydie
  - Maximum winds: 220 km/h (140 mph) (10-minute sustained)
  - Lowest pressure: 910 hPa (mbar)

Seasonal statistics
- Total disturbances: 13
- Total depressions: 12
- Total storms: 11
- Tropical cyclones: 4
- Intense tropical cyclones: 2
- Very intense tropical cyclones: 1
- Total fatalities: 11
- Total damage: Unknown

Related articles
- 1972–73 Australian region cyclone season; 1972–73 South Pacific cyclone season

The 1972–73 South-West Indian Ocean cyclone season was an above-average cyclone season. The season officially ran from November 1, 1972, to April 30, 1973.

== Systems ==
=== Severe Tropical Storm Ariane ===
- Severe tropical storm (MFR)
- Category 1 tropical cyclone (SSHWS)
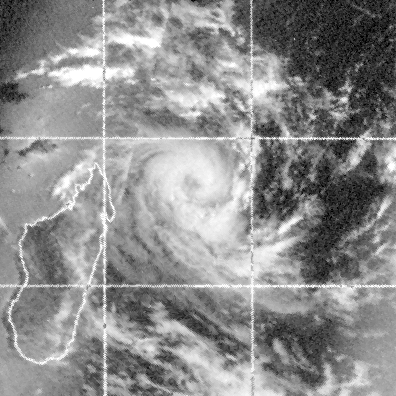
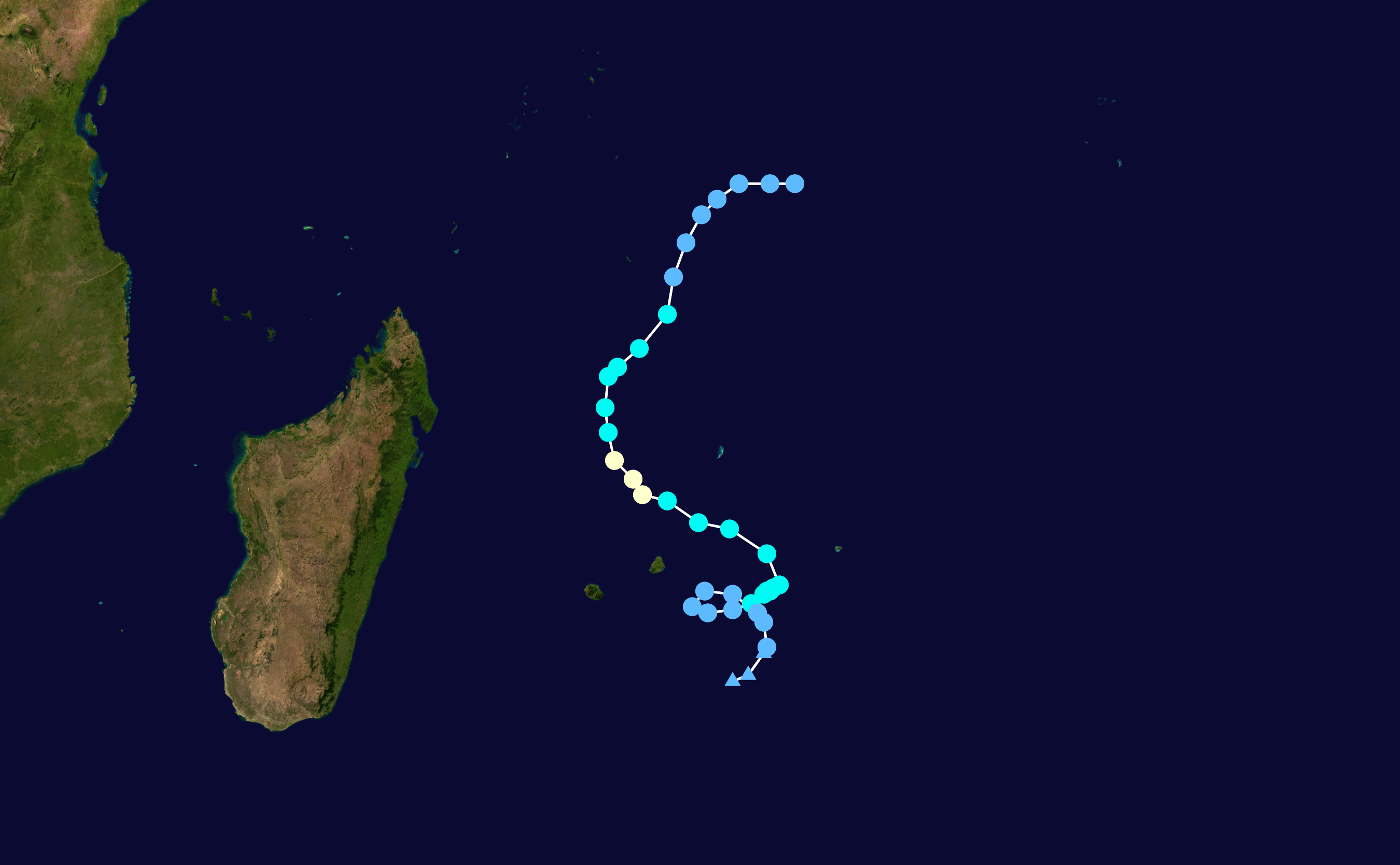
- Duration: November 26 – December 5
- Peak intensity: 110 km/h (70 mph) (10-min);

Ariana passed north of Mauritius and later executed a loop southeast of the island. The storm brought heavy rainfall and wind gusts of 92 km/h (57 mph).

=== Severe Tropical Storm Ivy–Beatrice ===
- Severe tropical storm (MFR)
- Category 1 tropical cyclone (SSHWS)
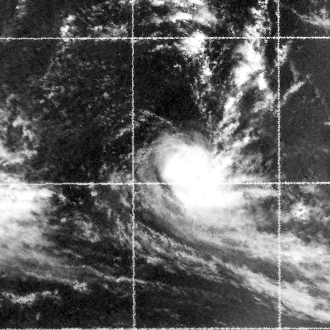
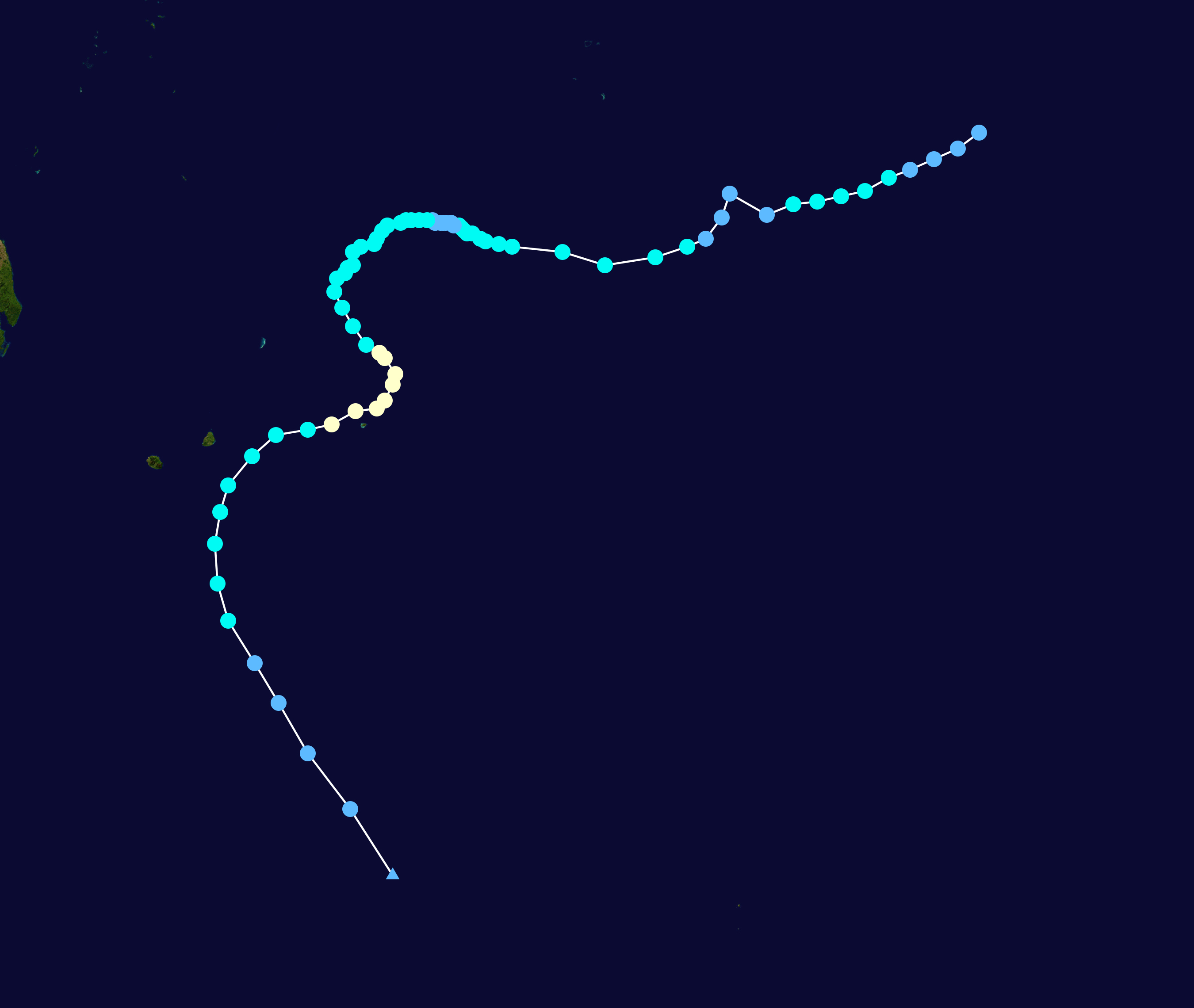
- Duration: December 9 (Crossed 80°E) – December 25
- Peak intensity: 110 km/h (70 mph) (10-min); ≤988 hPa (mbar)

=== Moderate Tropical Storm Charlotte ===
- Moderate tropical storm (MFR)
- Tropical storm (SSHWS)
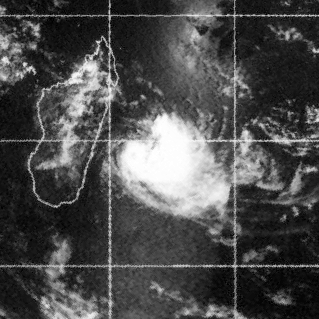
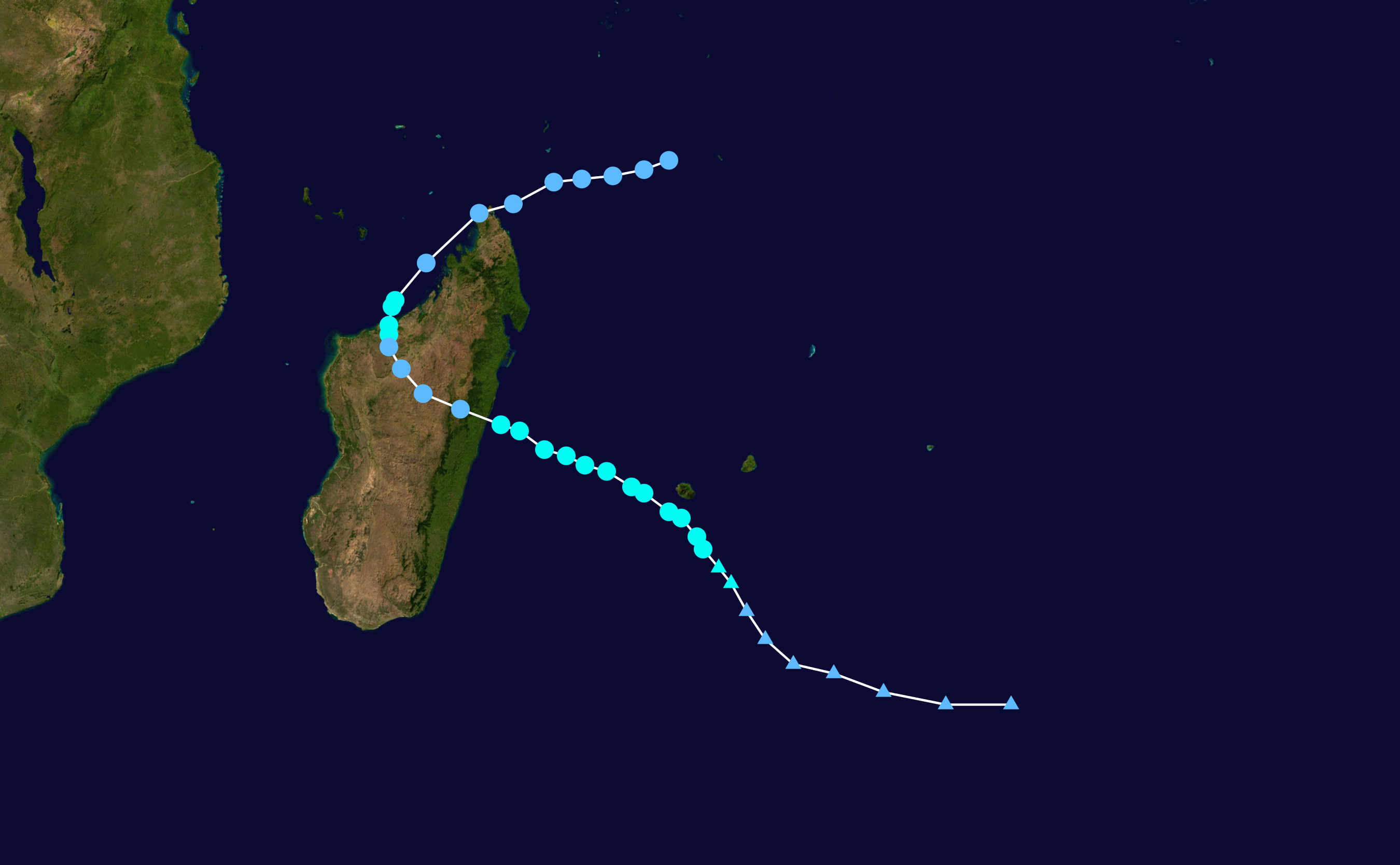
- Duration: January 3 – January 12
- Peak intensity: 75 km/h (45 mph) (10-min);

Charlotte passed just southwest of Réunion on January 8, producing 102 km/h (63 mph) wind gusts, as well as heavy rainfall reaching 813 mm (32.0 in) at Riviere de L'Est. The rains damaged crops and flooded roads, which killed one person due to drowning.

=== Moderate Tropical Storm Dorothee ===
- Moderate tropical storm (MFR)
- Tropical storm (SSHWS)
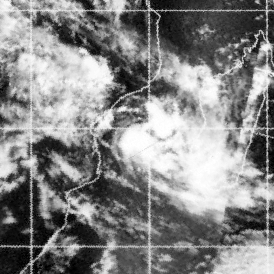
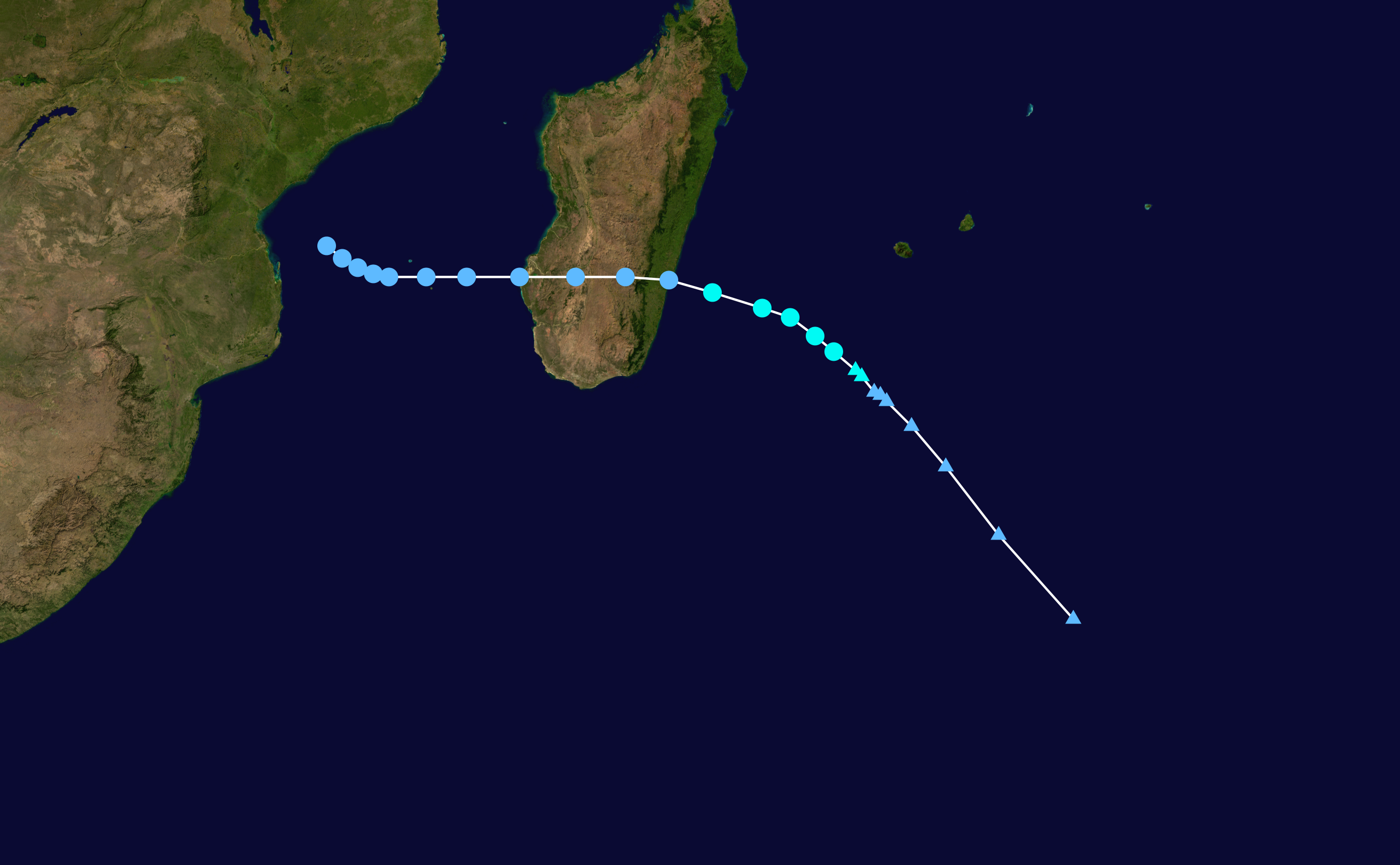
- Duration: January 10 – January 16
- Peak intensity: 65 km/h (40 mph) (10-min);

Dorothee produced a series of thunderstorms on Réunion while the storm passed to the southwest.

=== Tropical Disturbance Emmanuelle ===
- Tropical disturbance (MFR)
- Tropical depression (SSHWS)
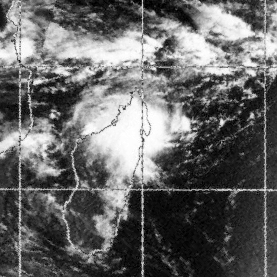
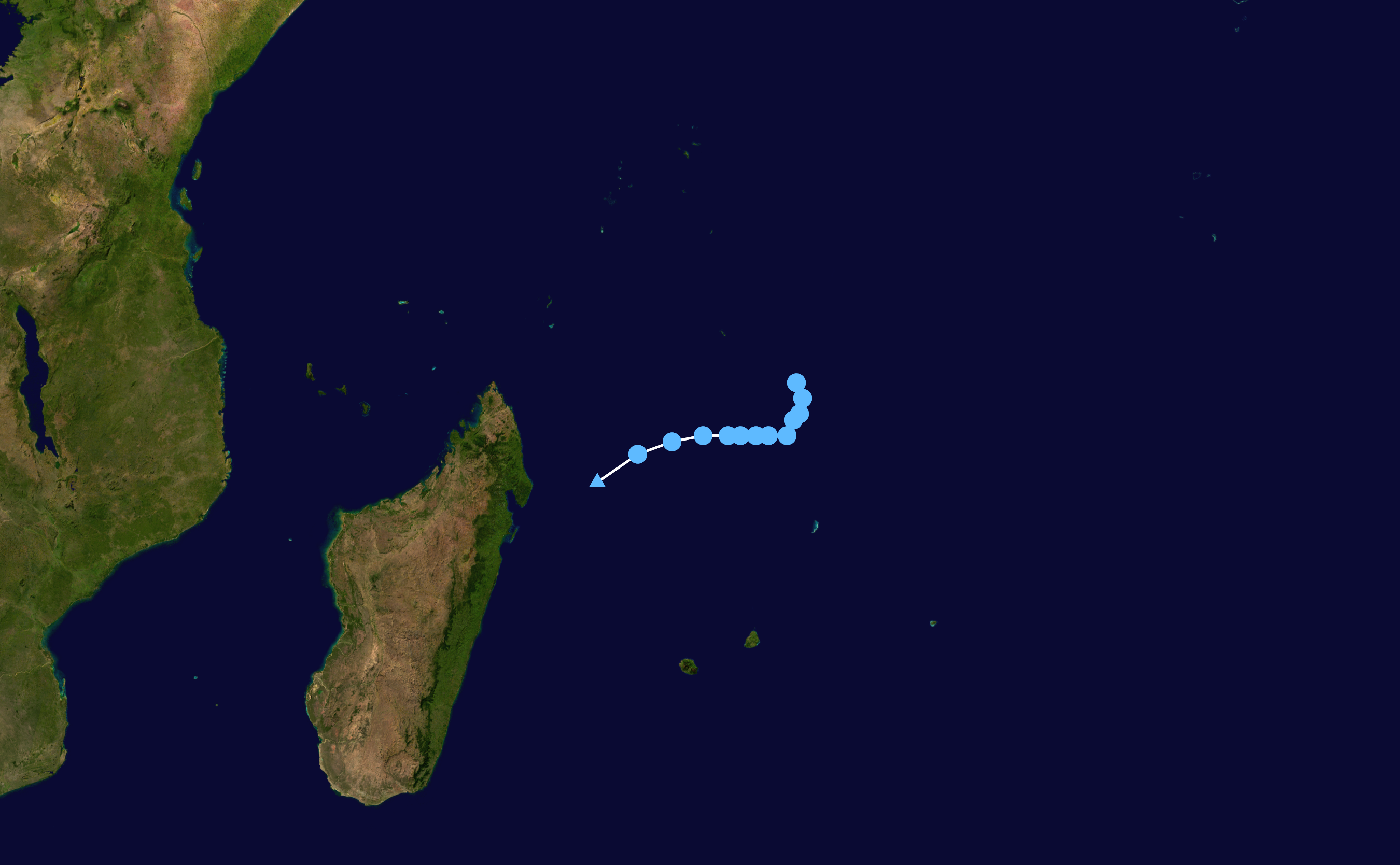
- Duration: January 17 – January 20
- Peak intensity: 45 km/h (30 mph) (10-min);

=== Moderate Tropical Storm Faustine ===
- Tropical storm (SSHWS)
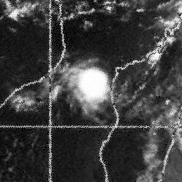
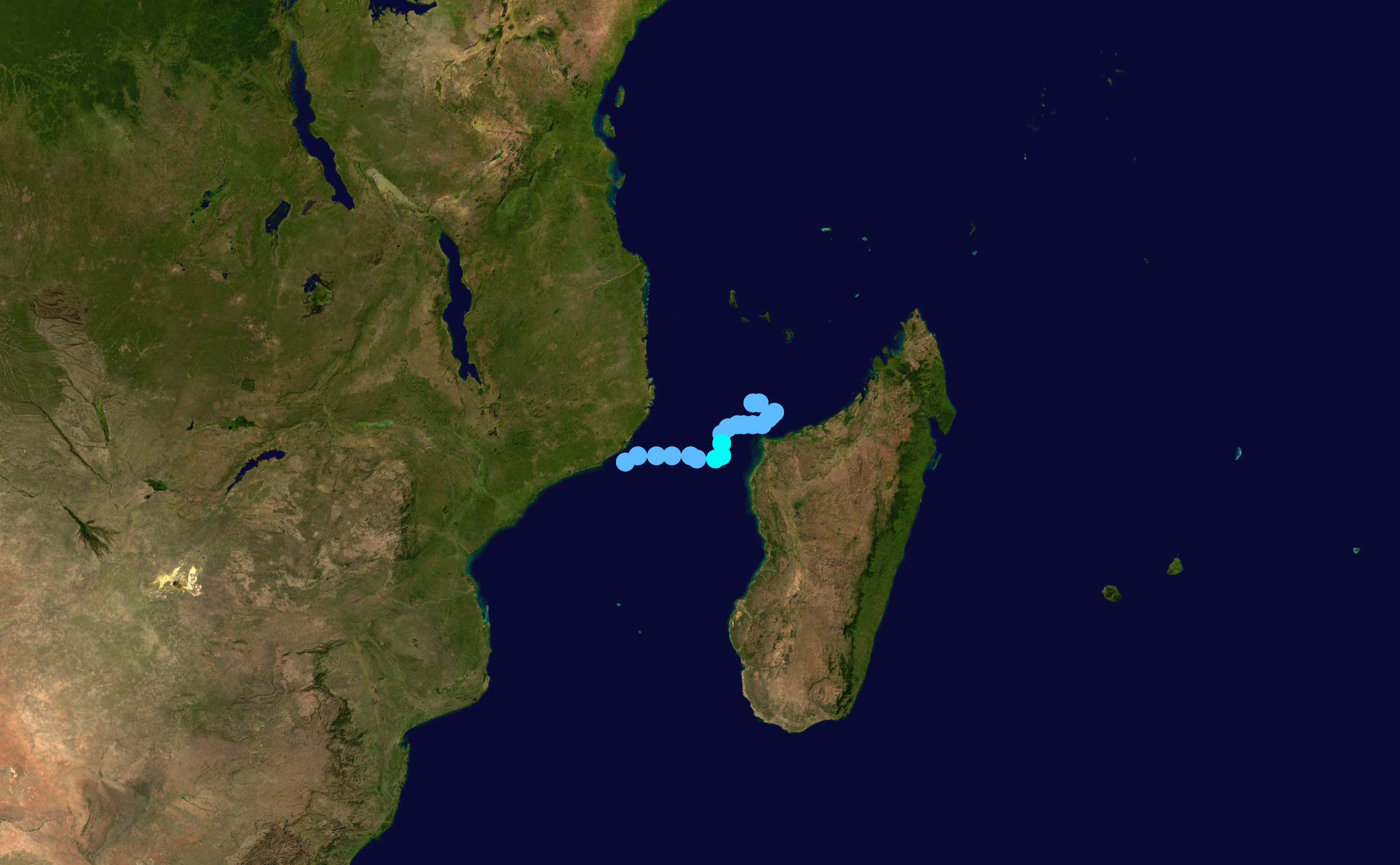
- Duration: January 17 – January 22
- Peak intensity: 65 km/h (40 mph) (1-min);

=== Intense Tropical Cyclone Leila–Gertrude ===
- Intense tropical cyclone (MFR)
- Category 3 tropical cyclone (SSHWS)
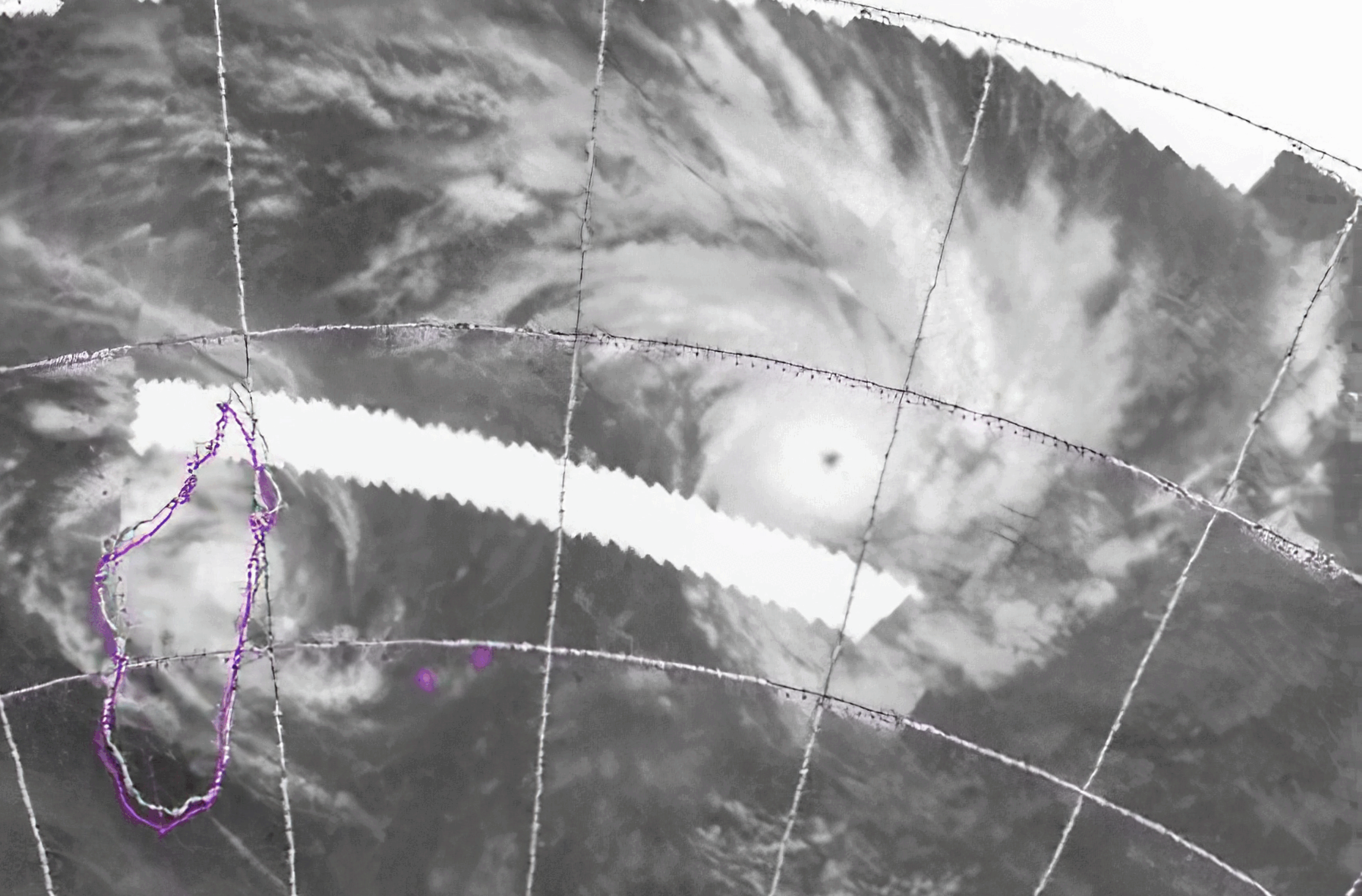
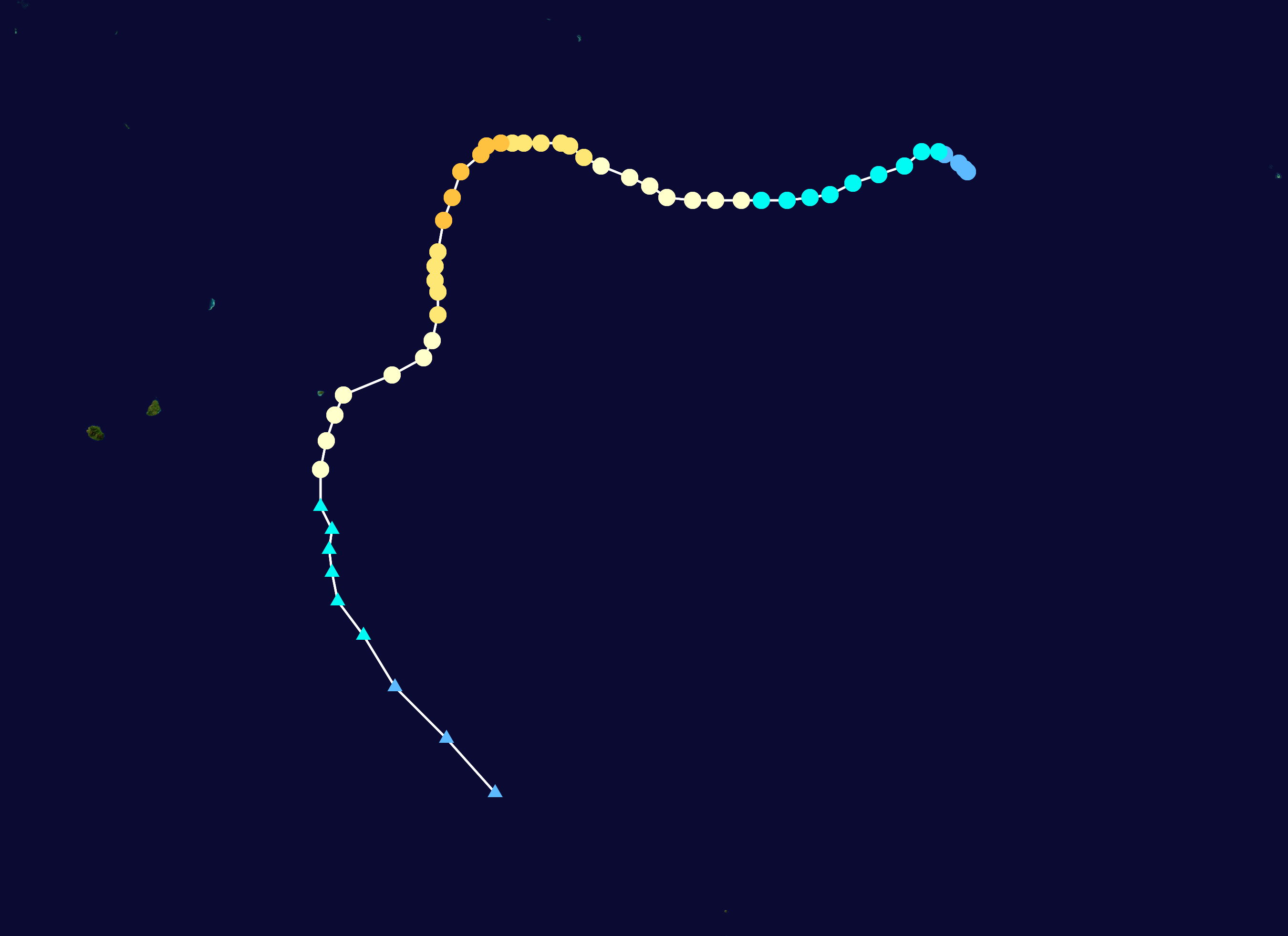
- Duration: January 24 (Crossed 80°E) – February 3
- Peak intensity: 175 km/h (110 mph) (10-min);

Cyclone Gertrude brushed eastern Rodrigues on January 31, producing 169 km/h (105 mph), as well as 296.4 mm (11.67 in) of rainfall.

=== Severe Tropical Storm Hortense ===
- Severe tropical storm (MFR)
- Category 1 tropical cyclone (SSHWS)
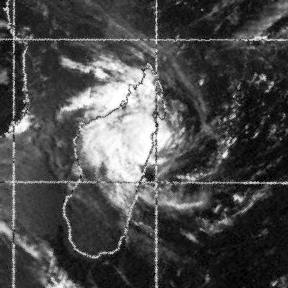
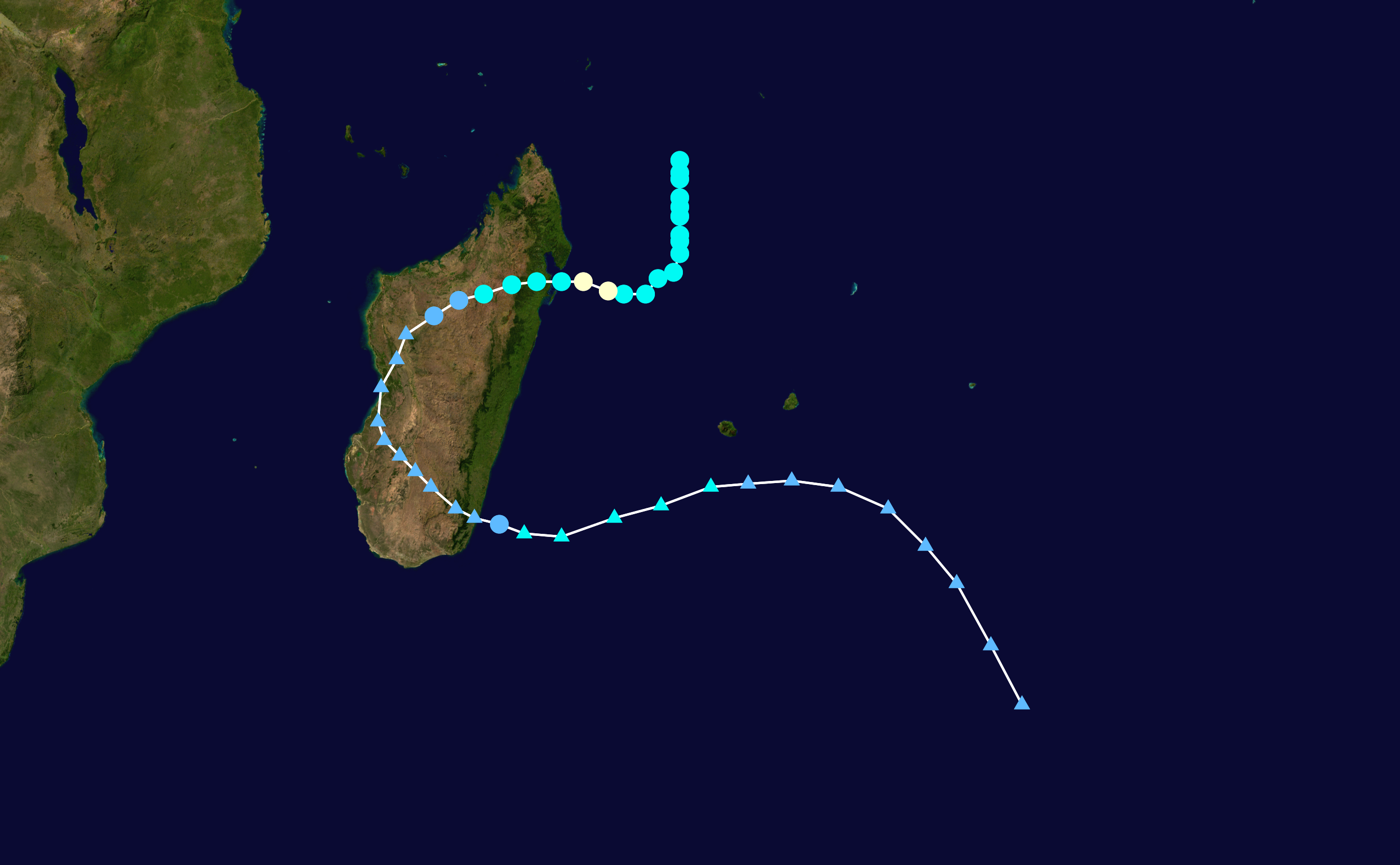
- Duration: January 24 – February 2
- Peak intensity: 100 km/h (65 mph) (10-min);

On February 2, Hortense passed south of Réunion, bringing rainfall to the island.

=== Tropical Cyclone Jessy ===
- Tropical cyclone (MFR)
- Category 2 tropical cyclone (SSHWS)
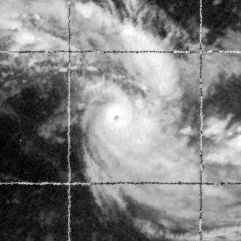
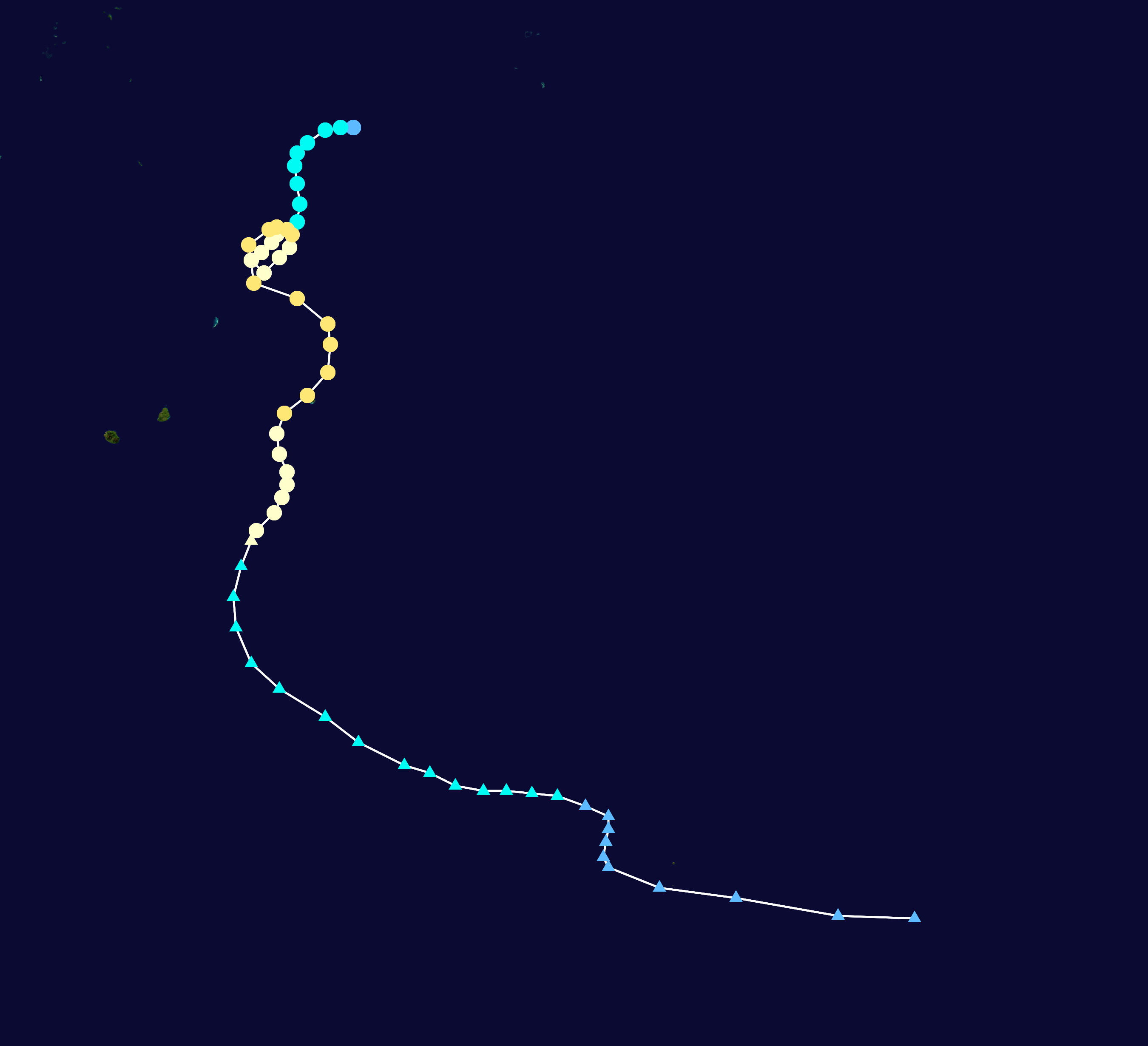
- Duration: February 14 – February 26
- Peak intensity: 155 km/h (100 mph) (10-min);

On February 21, Jessy struck Rodrigues, bringing heavy rainfall and 221 km/h (137 mph) wind gusts, causing power outages.

=== Severe Tropical Storm Isis ===
- Severe tropical storm (MFR)
- Tropical storm (SSHWS)
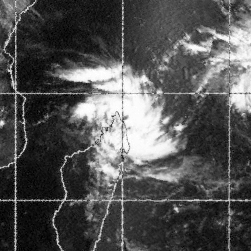
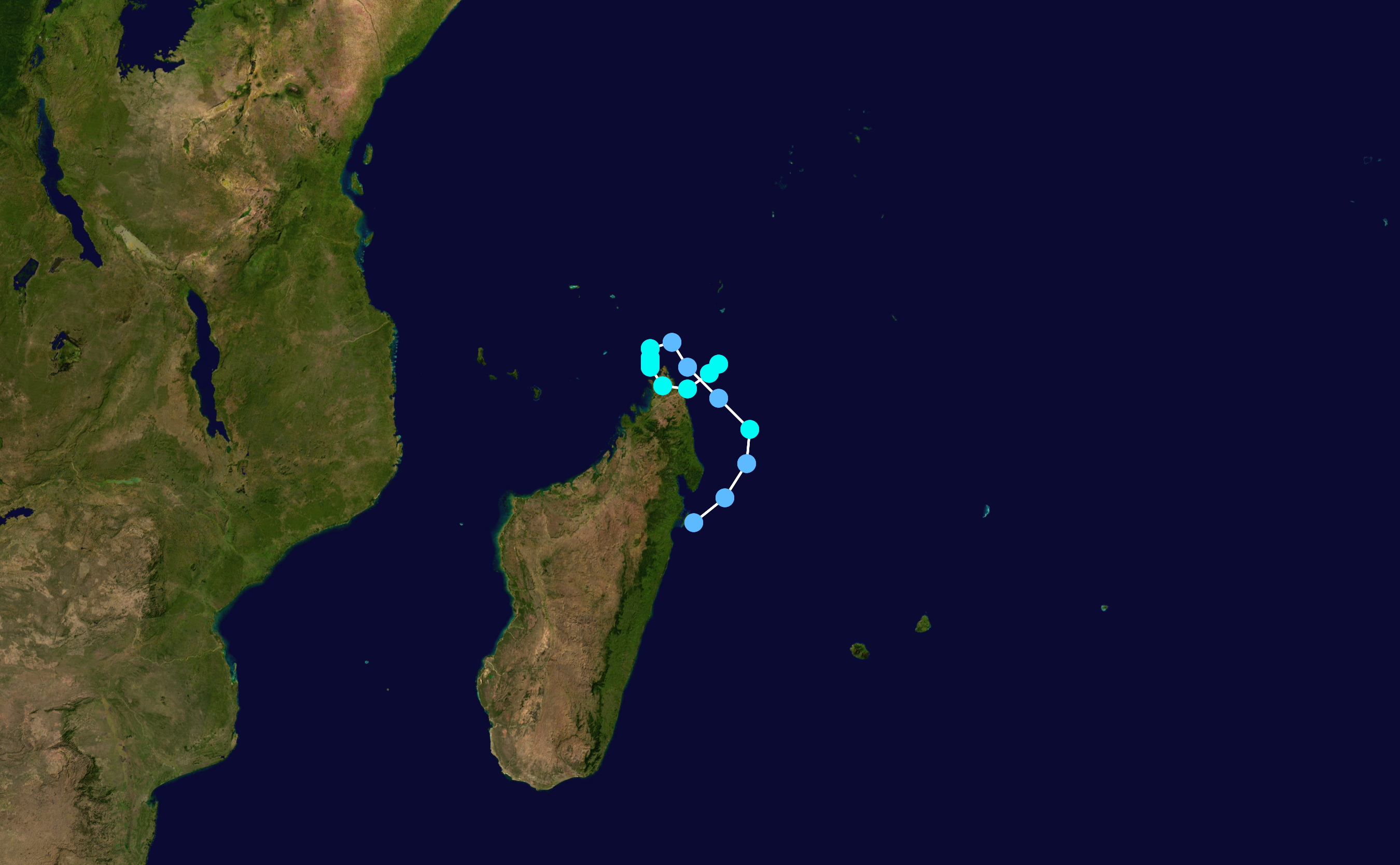
- Duration: February 15 – February 19
- Peak intensity: 100 km/h (65 mph) (10-min);

=== Severe Tropical Storm Kitty ===
- Severe tropical storm (MFR)
- Category 1 tropical cyclone (SSHWS)
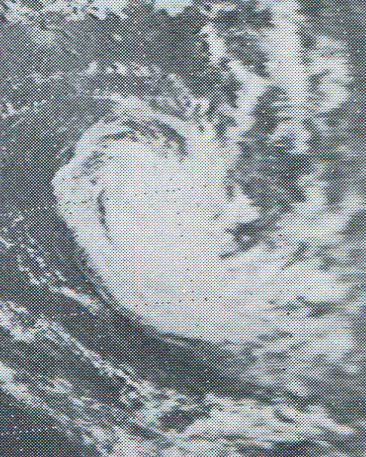
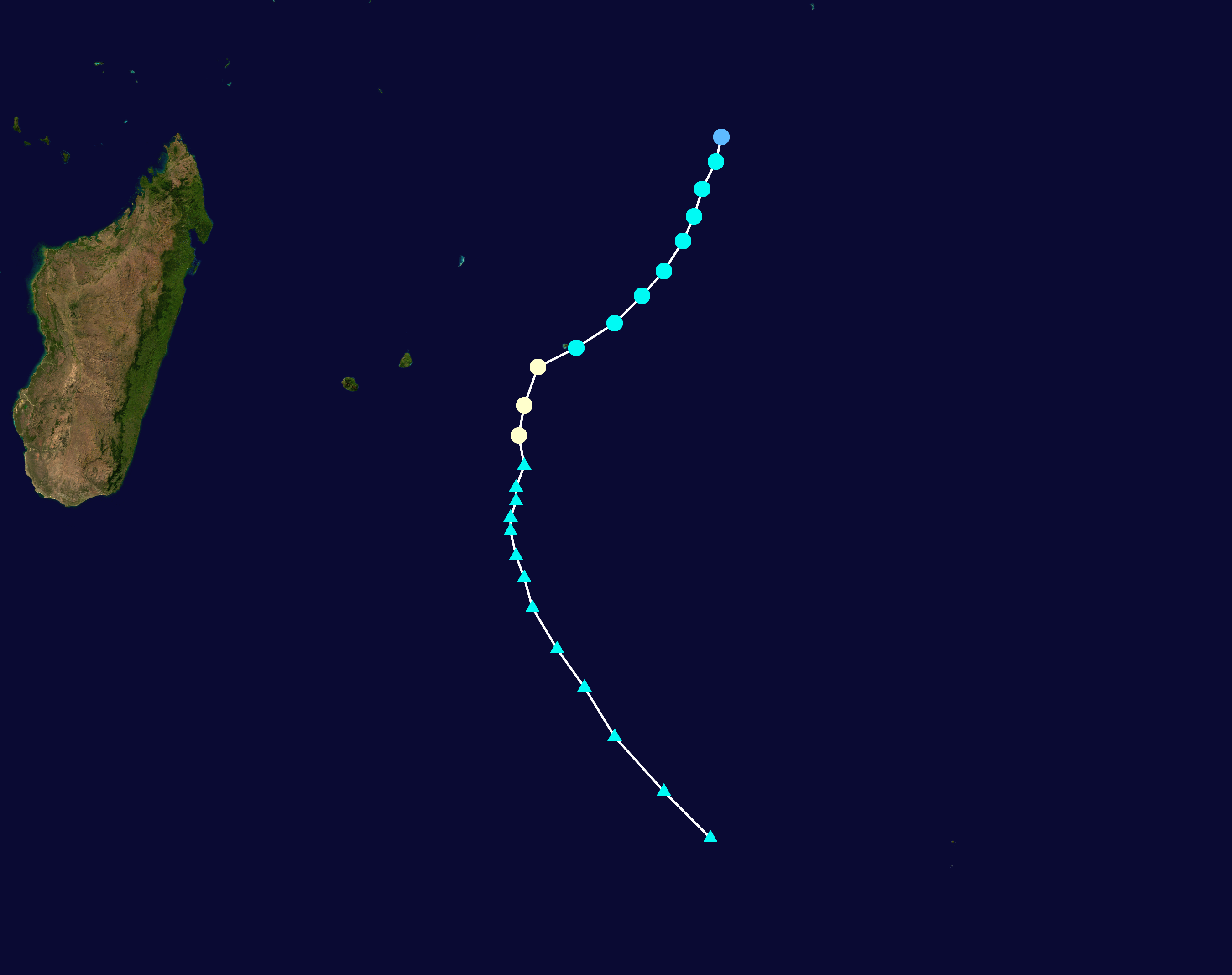
- Duration: February 27 – March 5
- Peak intensity: 110 km/h (70 mph) (10-min);

On March 1, Kitty struck Rodrigues, causing power outages.

=== Very Intense Tropical Cyclone Lydie ===
- Very intense tropical cyclone (MFR)
- Category 4 tropical cyclone (SSHWS)
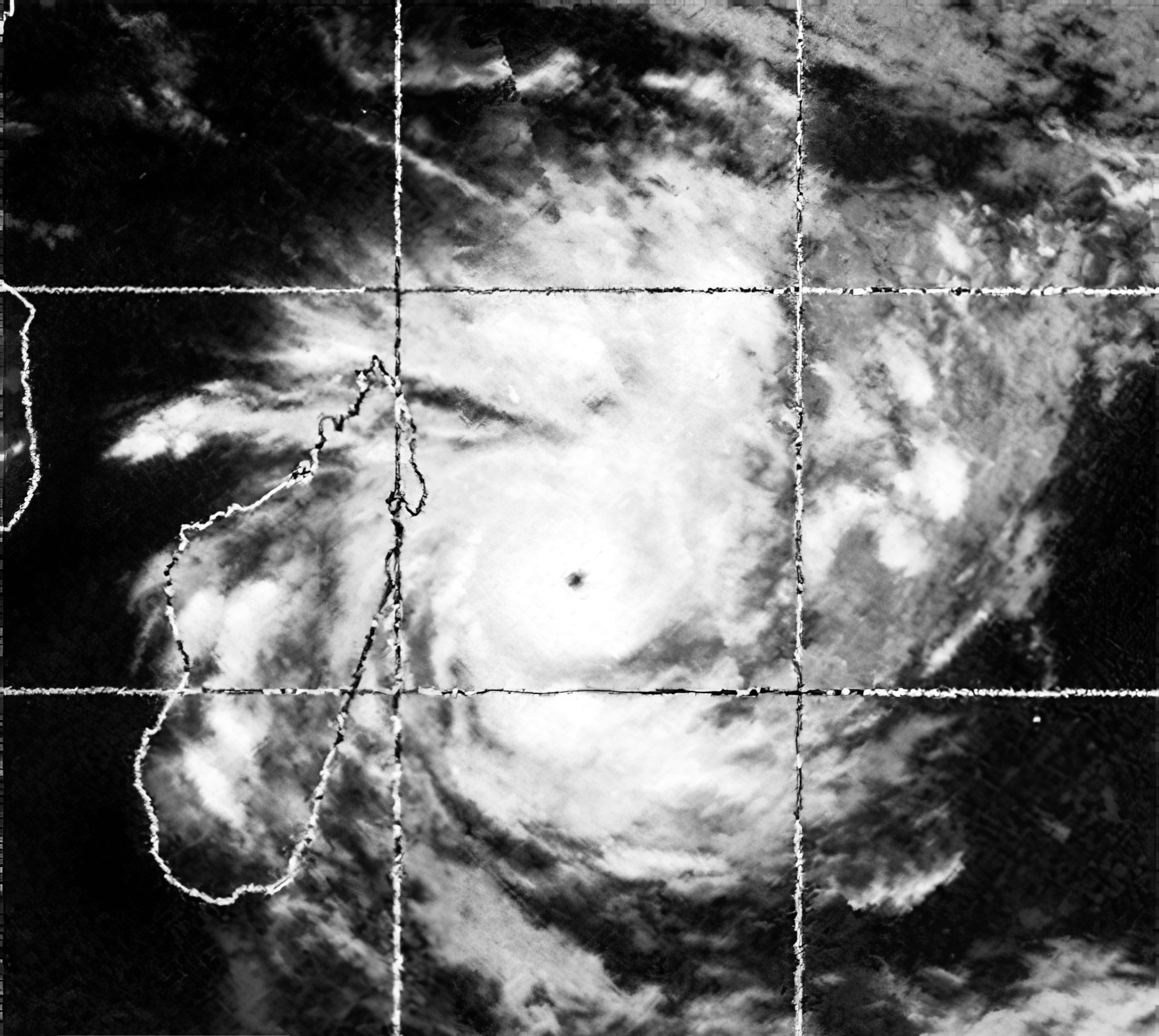
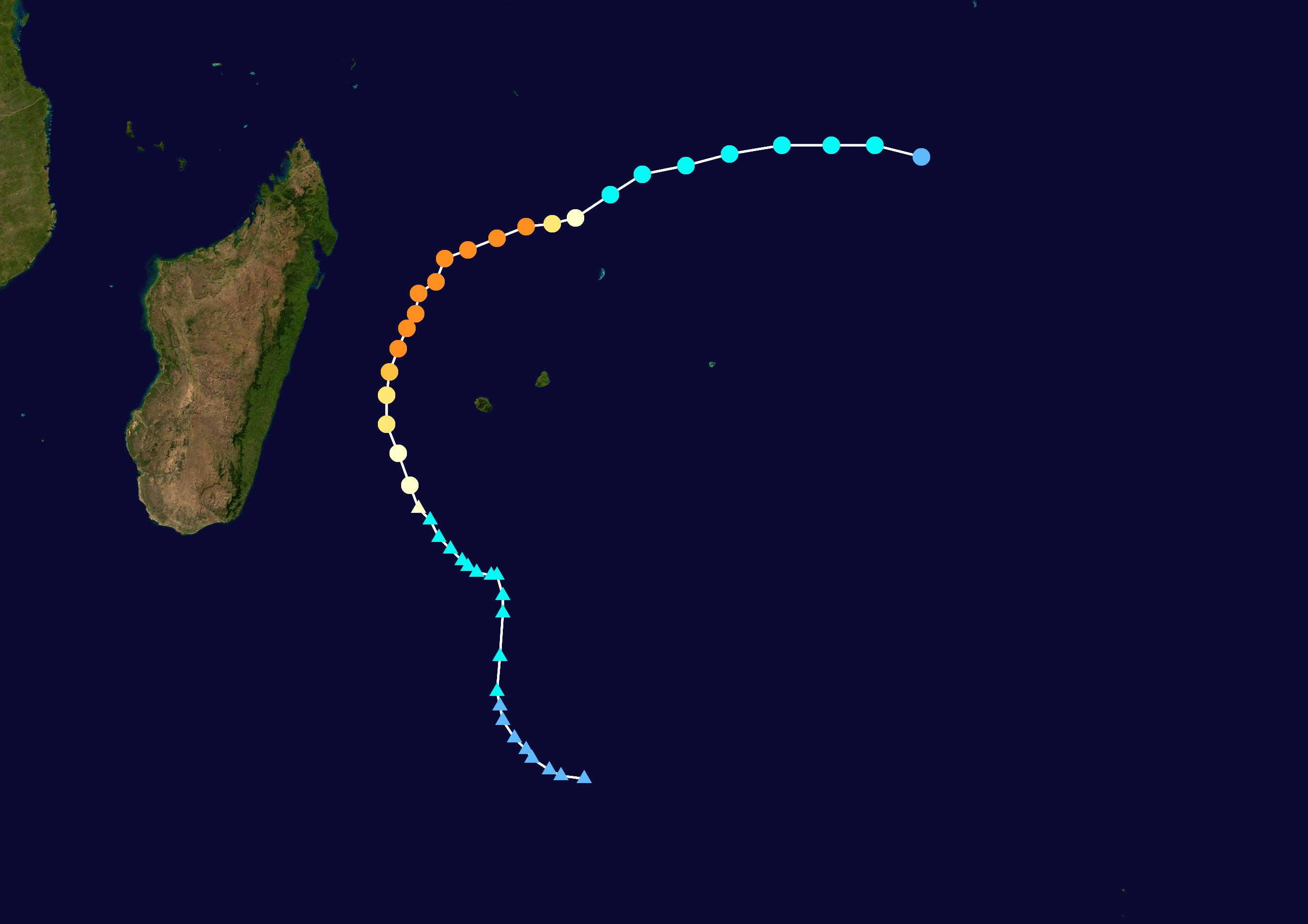
- Duration: March 5 – March 16
- Peak intensity: 220 km/h (140 mph) (10-min); 910 hPa (mbar)

This is the first "Very intense tropical cyclone" in the South-West Indian Ocean.

On March 10, Lydie passed west of Réunion, producing wind gusts of 162 km/h (101 mph) in the mountainous peaks. For four days, the storm dropped heavy rainfall on the island, reaching 655 mm (25.8 in). Flooding killed 10 people on the island, and caused crop damage.

=== Severe Tropical Storm Roma ===
- Severe tropical storm (MFR)
- Tropical storm (SSHWS)
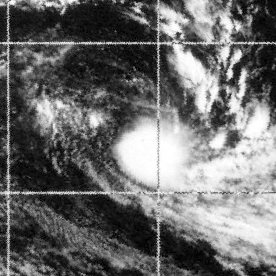
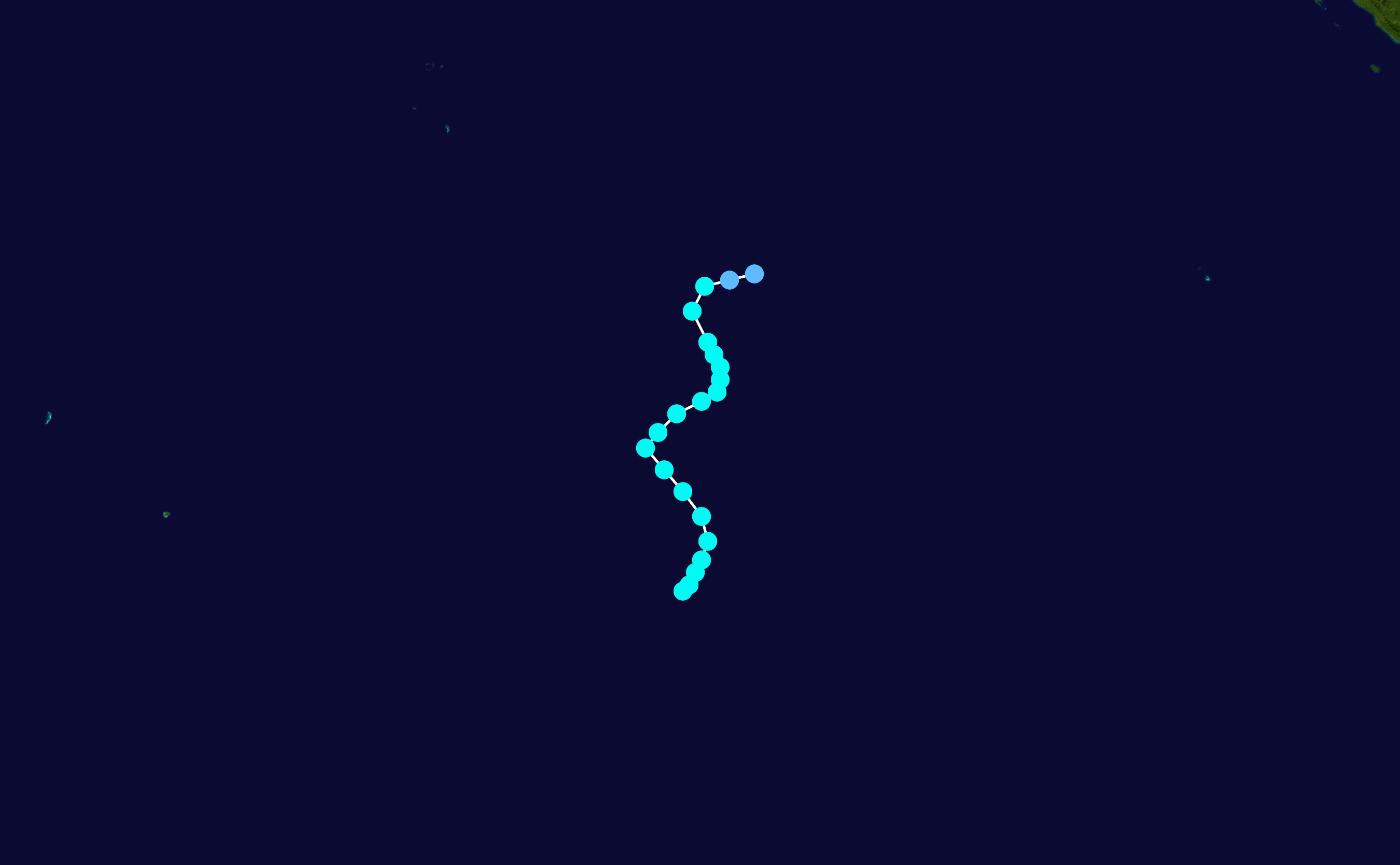
- Duration: April 18 – April 23
- Peak intensity: 100 km/h (65 mph) (10-min); 982 hPa (mbar)

Cyclone Roma existed from April 18 to April 23.

=== Tropical Cyclone Marcelle ===
- Tropical cyclone (MFR)
- Category 1 tropical cyclone (SSHWS)
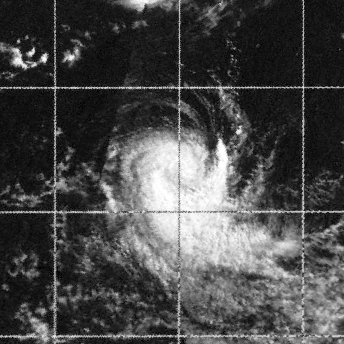
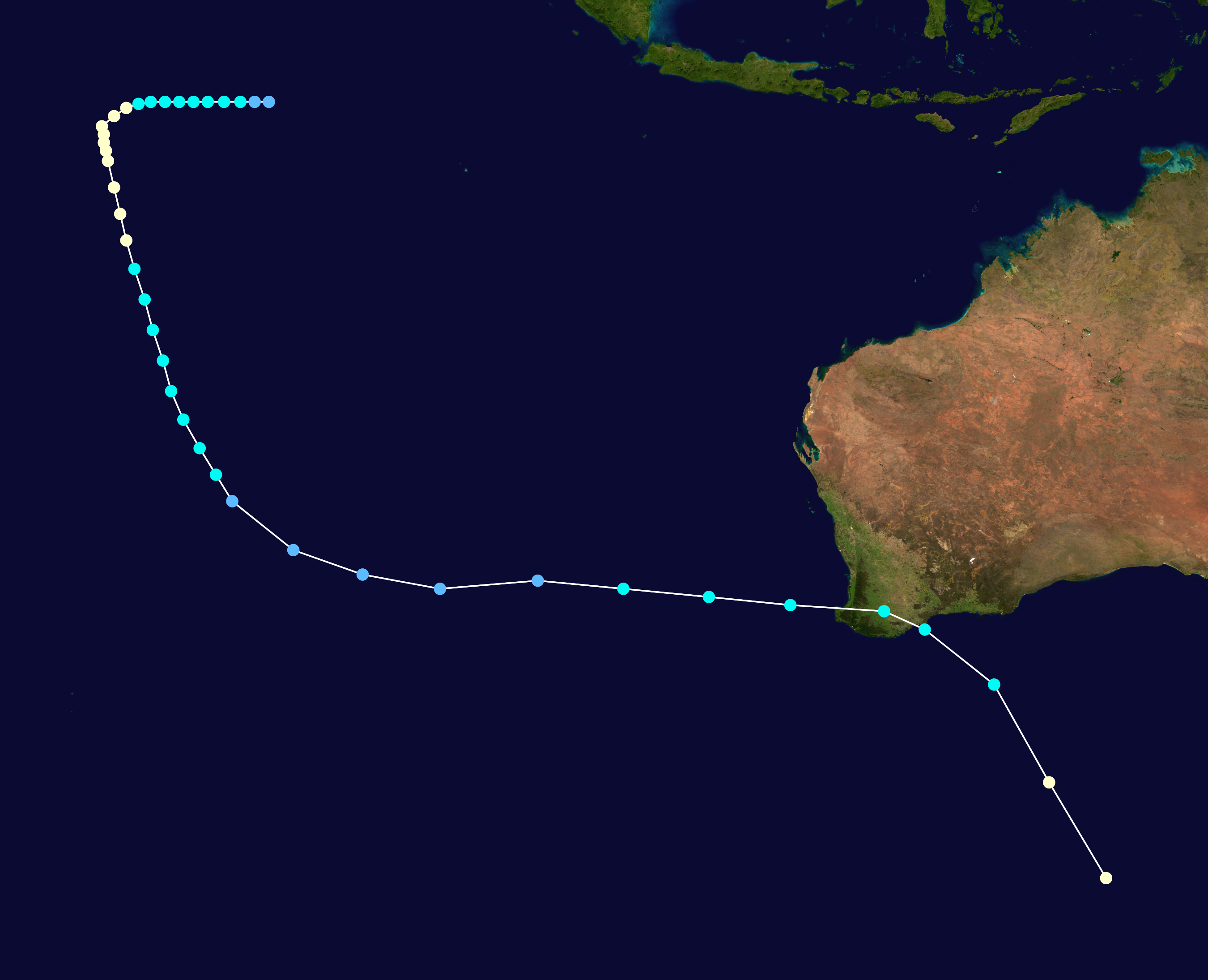
- Duration: May 1 (Crossed 80°E) – May 3 (Crossed 90°E)
- Peak intensity: 130 km/h (80 mph) (10-min); 972 hPa (mbar)

== See also ==
- Atlantic hurricane seasons: 1972, 1973
- Eastern Pacific hurricane seasons: 1972, 1973
- Western Pacific typhoon seasons: 1972, 1973
- North Indian Ocean cyclone seasons: 1972, 1973
