= 1972–73 Australian region cyclone season =

Deadliest Australian cyclone season on record

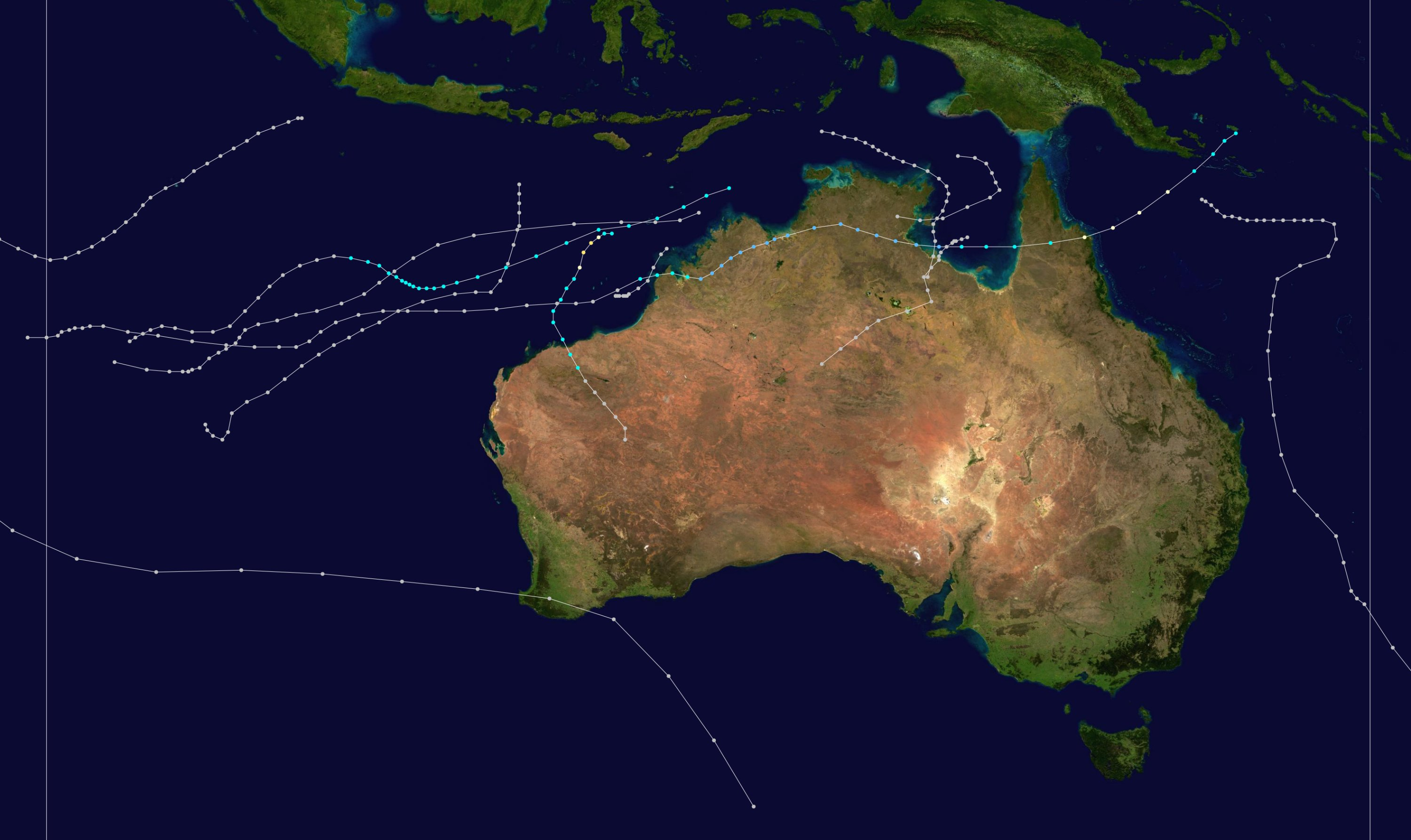
- Season summary map

Seasonal boundaries
- First system formed: 7 December 1972
- Last system dissipated: 6 May 1973

Strongest storm
- By maximum sustained winds: Madge
  - Maximum winds: 165 km/h (105 mph) (10-minute sustained)
  - Lowest pressure: 952 hPa (mbar)
- By central pressure: "Flores"
  - Maximum winds: 150 km/h (90 mph) (10-minute sustained)
  - Lowest pressure: 950 hPa (mbar)

Seasonal statistics
- Tropical lows: 15
- Tropical cyclones: 15
- Severe tropical cyclones: 9
- Total fatalities: 1,650+ (Deadliest Australian region cyclone season recorded)
- Total damage: Unknown

Related articles
- 1972–73 South Pacific cyclone season; 1972–73 South-West Indian Ocean cyclone season

The 1972–73 Australian region cyclone season was an above-average tropical cyclone season, in terms of activity. Additionally, it is also the deadliest tropical cyclone season recorded in the Australian region, with the Flores cyclone killing an estimated 1,650 people alone, making it the single-deadliest tropical cyclone recorded in the entire Southern Hemisphere.

== Systems ==
=== Tropical Cyclone Ivy-Beatrice ===
- Category 1 tropical cyclone (Australian scale)
- Tropical storm (SSHWS)
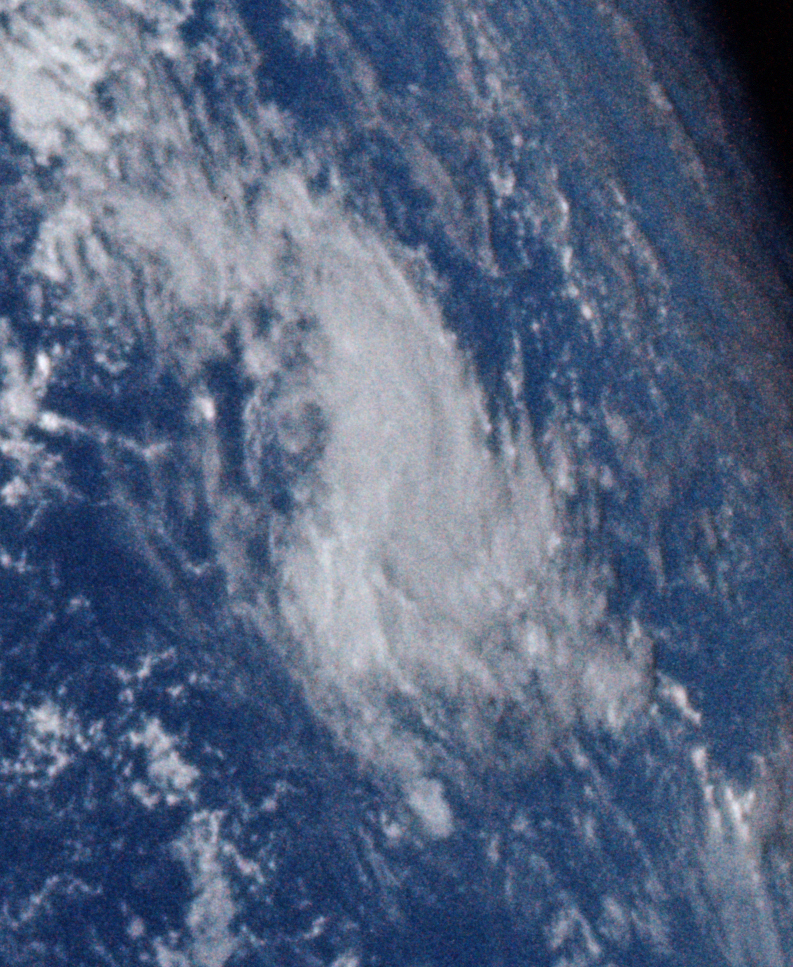
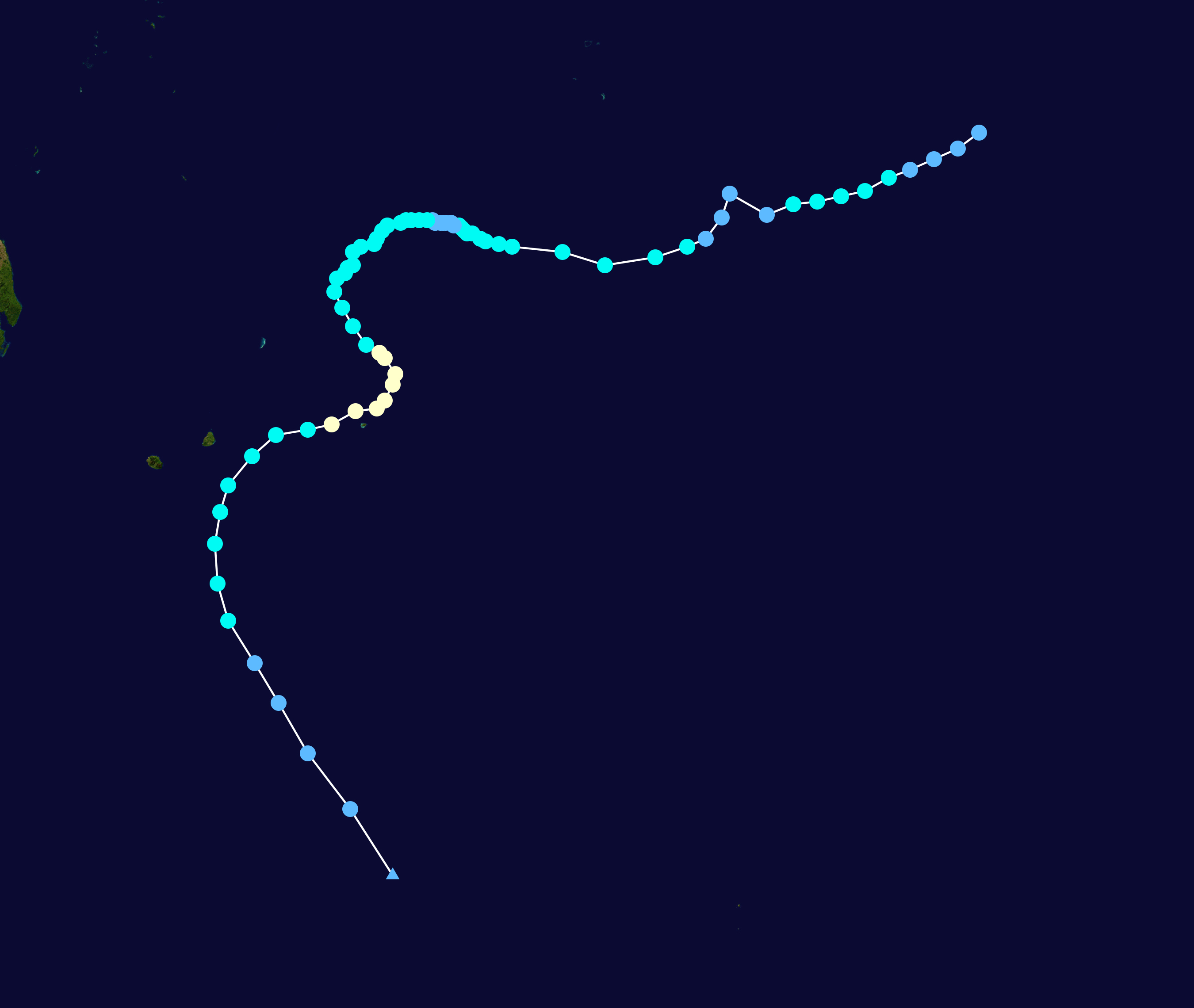
- Duration: 7 December – 9 December (Crossed 80°E)
- Peak intensity: 65 km/h (40 mph) (10-min); 994 hPa (mbar)

Tropical Cyclone Ivy developed over the eastern Indian Ocean on 7 December. The cyclone entered the southwest Indian Ocean basin after crossing 80°E and was renamed Beatrice.

=== Severe Tropical Cyclone Jean ===
- Category 3 severe tropical cyclone (Australian scale)
- Category 1 tropical cyclone (SSHWS)
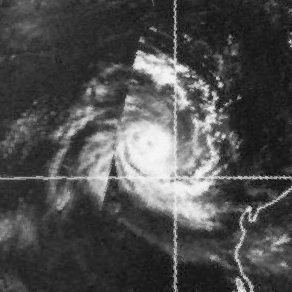
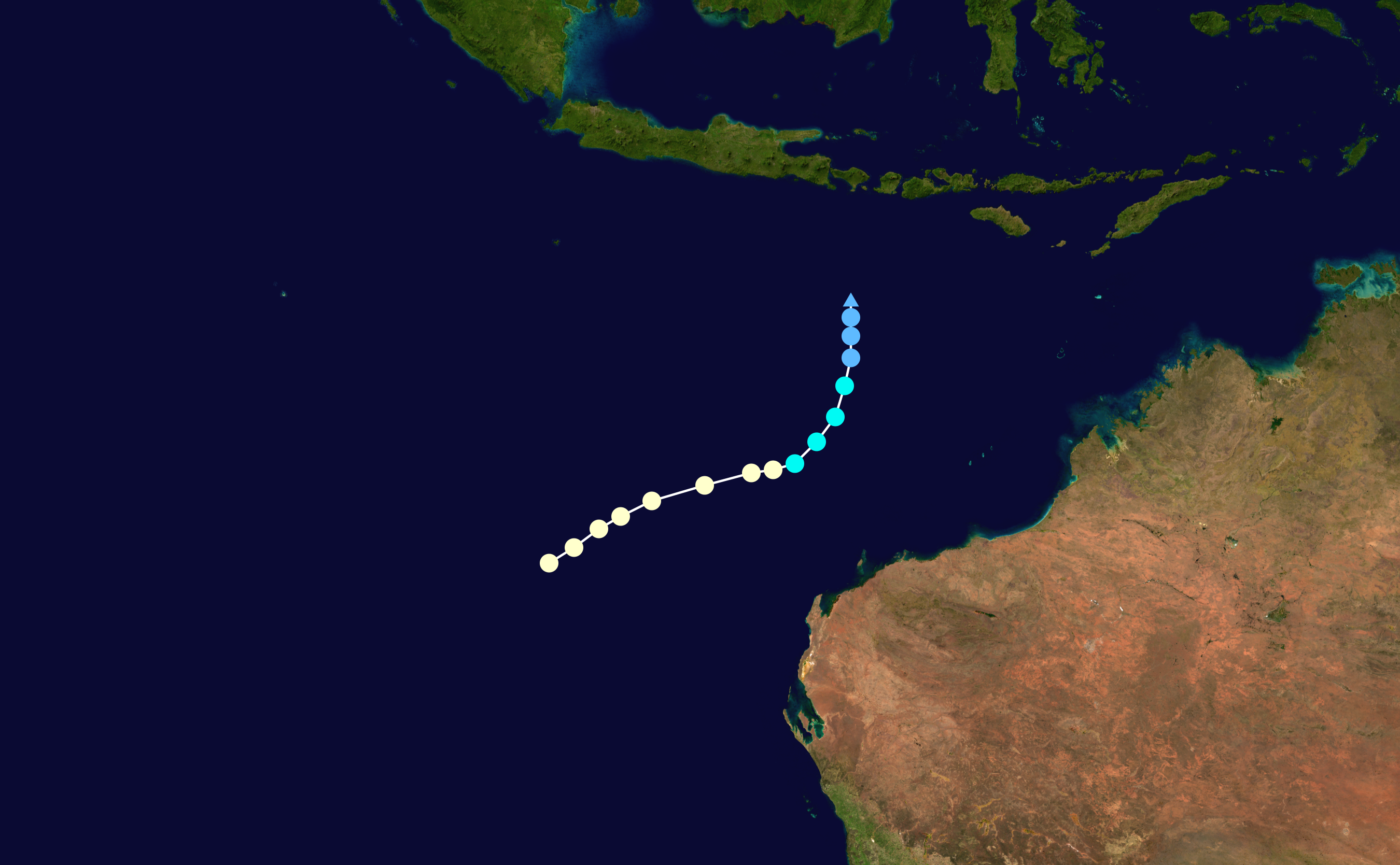
- Duration: 10 January – 17 January
- Peak intensity: 150 km/h (90 mph) (10-min); 964 hPa (mbar)

On 10 January Jean developed northwest of Western Australia. It strengthened into a Category 4 severe tropical cyclone, before being last noted on 17 January.

=== Severe Tropical Cyclone Kerry ===
- Category 4 severe tropical cyclone (Australian scale)
- Category 2 tropical cyclone (SSHWS)
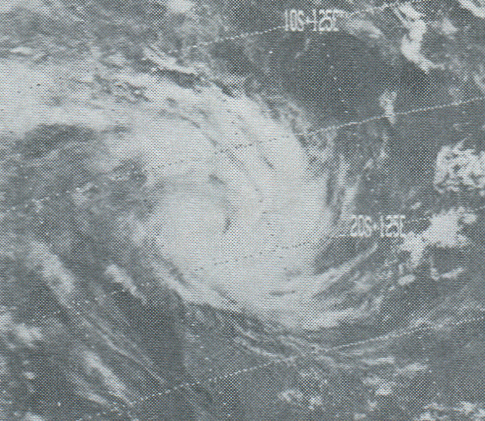
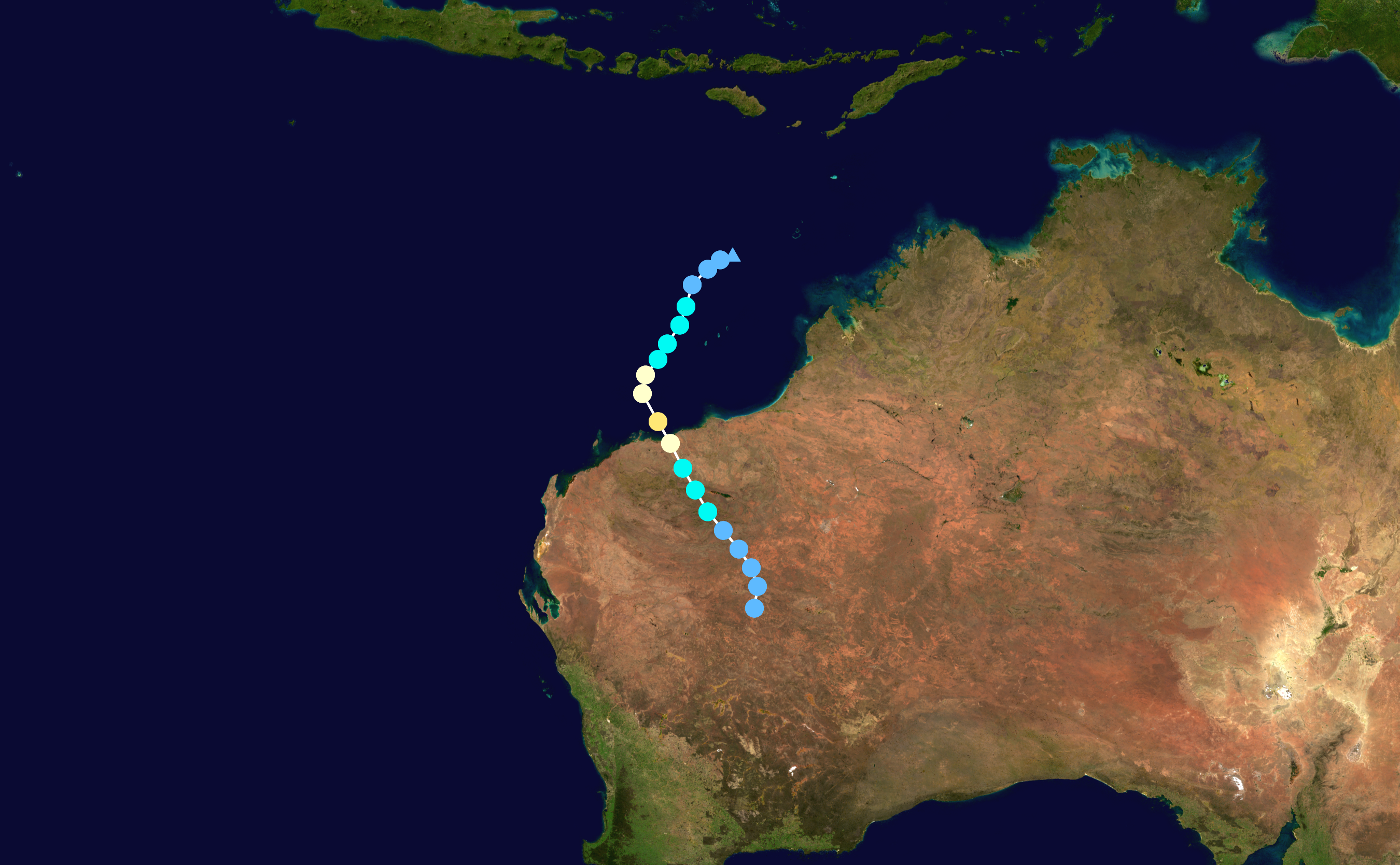
- Duration: 19 January – 24 January
- Peak intensity: 165 km/h (105 mph) (10-min); 960 hPa (mbar)

At Wickham on 21 January 1973 more than 30 houses were partly unroofed and some houses received major damage. There was no damage to buildings in Dampier, Roebourne or Karratha as the cyclone crossed the coast well to the east. Kerry passed close to a number of oil-drilling rigs causing damage and lost productivity time that cost over one million dollars. Maximum recorded gust was 140 km/h at Cape Lambert.

=== Tropical Cyclone Leila-Gertrude ===
- Category 2 tropical cyclone (Australian scale)
- Tropical storm (SSHWS)
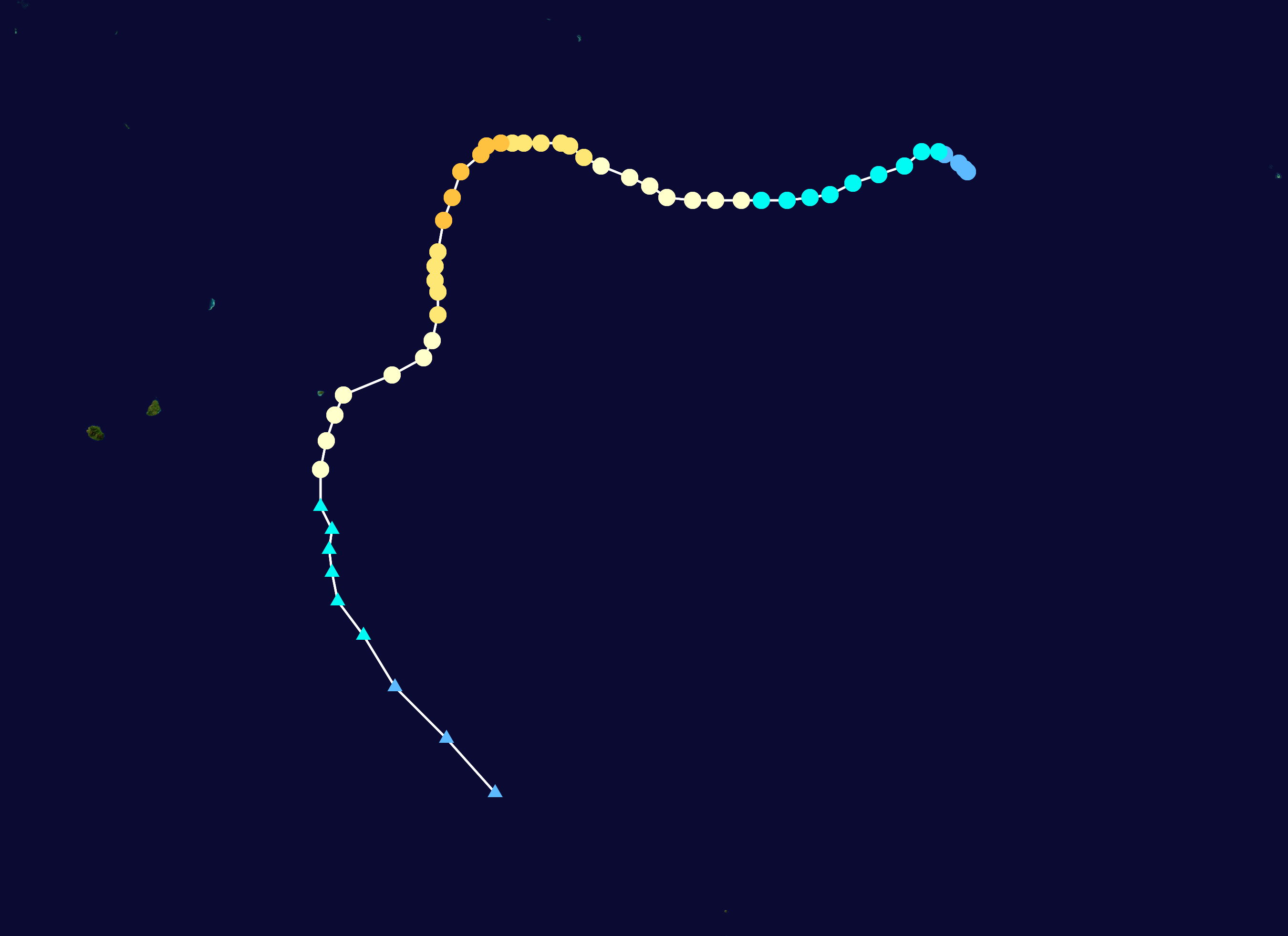
- Duration: 21 January – 23 January (Crossed 80°E)
- Peak intensity: 100 km/h (60 mph) (10-min); 980 hPa (mbar)

Tropical Cyclone Leila formed offshore Western Australia on 21 January. Moving generally westward, the storm crossed 80°E on 23 January and was renamed Gertrude.

=== Severe Tropical Cyclone Adeline ===
- Category 3 severe tropical cyclone (Australian scale)
- Category 1 tropical cyclone (SSHWS)
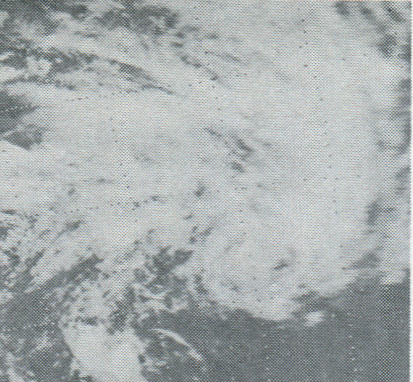
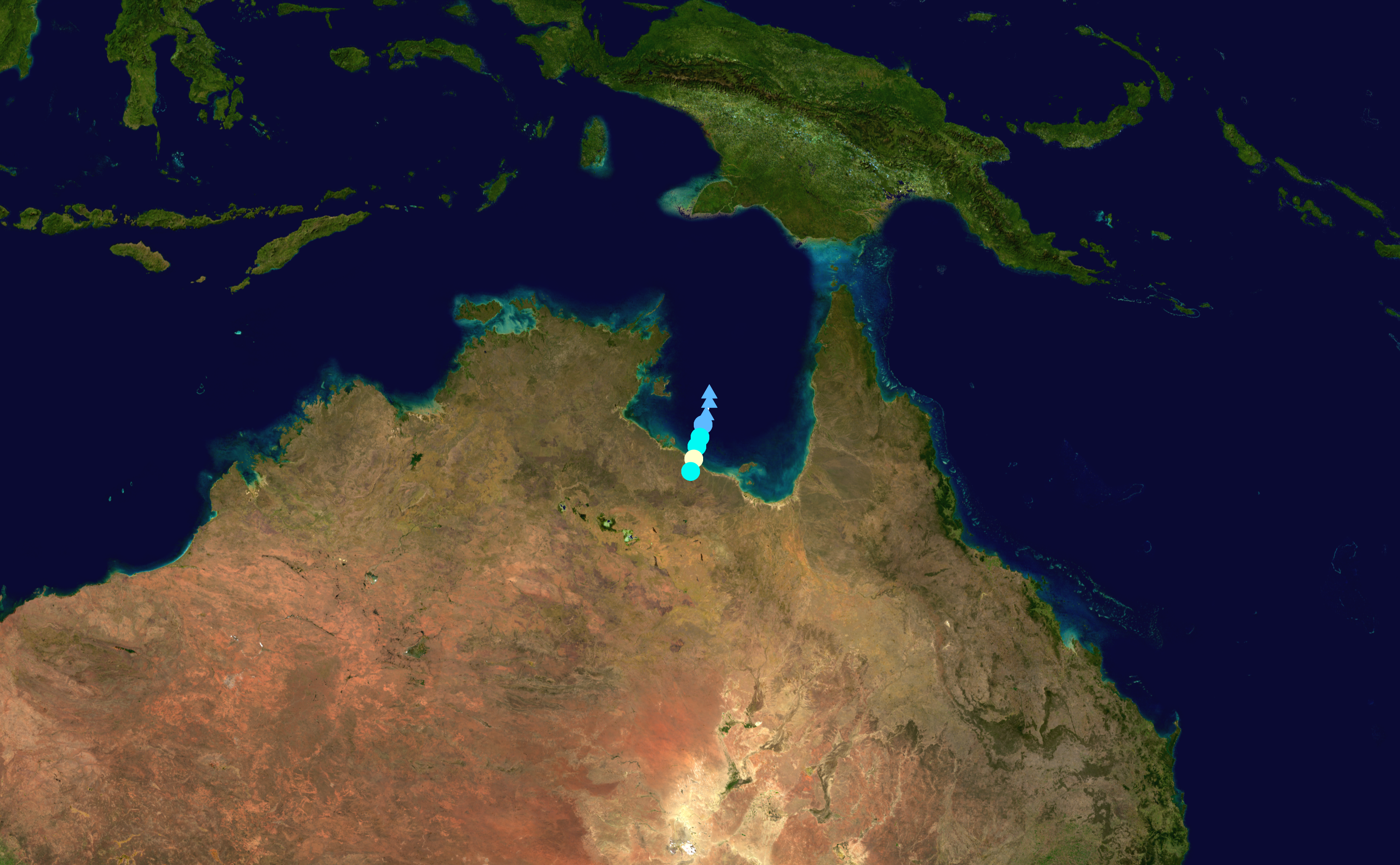
- Duration: 27 January – 29 January
- Peak intensity: 130 km/h (80 mph) (10-min); 970 hPa (mbar)

Tropical Cyclone Adeline developed in the Gulf of Carpentaria on 27 January. Moving south-southwestward, Adeline made landfall near the Northern Territory–Queensland border, shortly before dissipating on 29 January.

=== Tropical Cyclone Maud ===
- Category 1 tropical cyclone (Australian scale)
- Tropical storm (SSHWS)
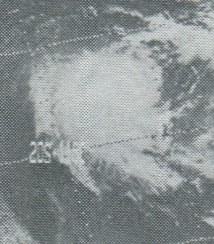
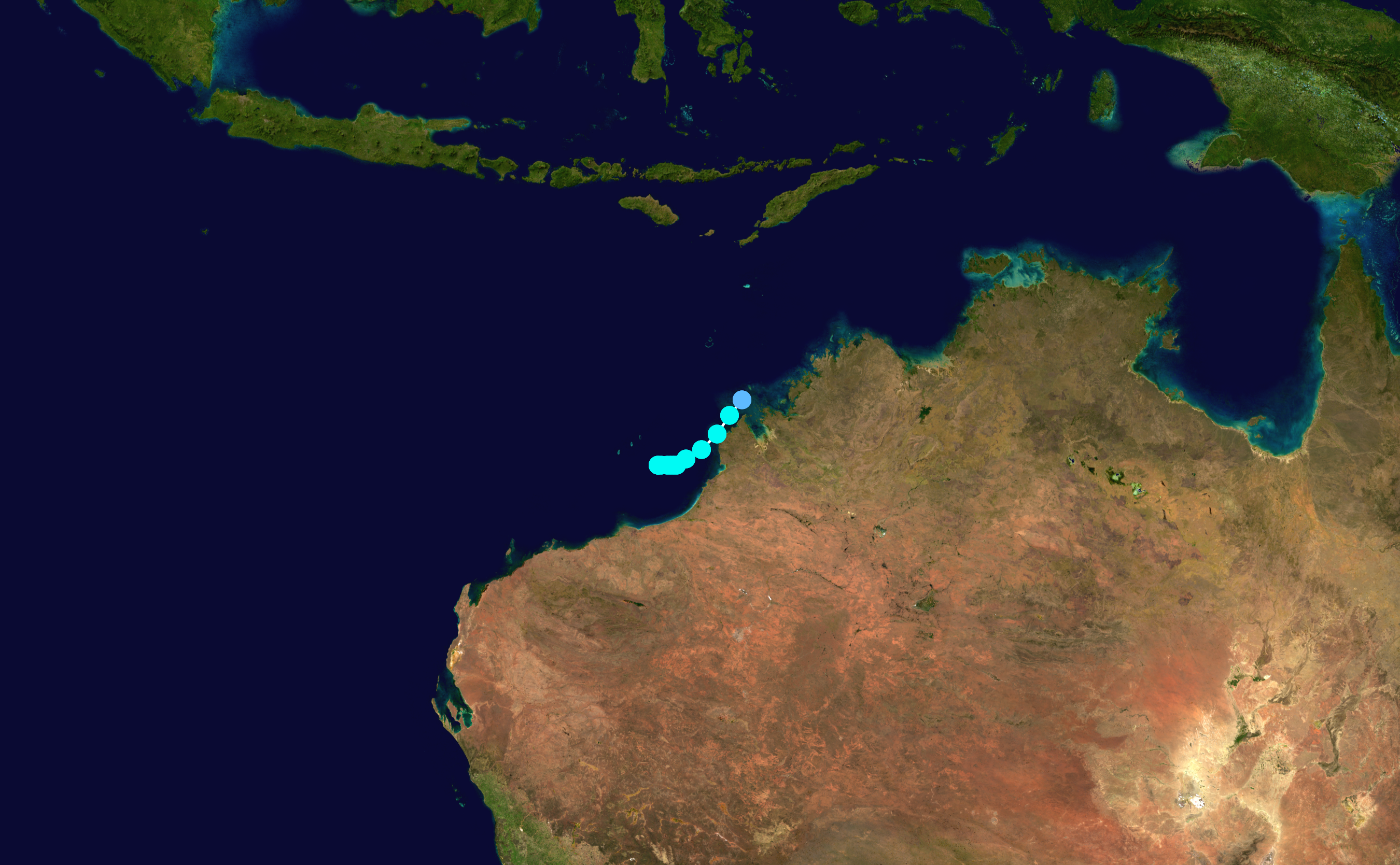
- Duration: 28 January – 31 January
- Peak intensity: 85 km/h (50 mph) (10-min); 990 hPa (mbar)

Tropical Cyclone Maud existed offshore Western Australia from 28 January to 31 January.

=== Severe Tropical Cyclone Kirsty ===
- Category 3 severe tropical cyclone (Australian scale)
- Category 1 tropical cyclone (SSHWS)
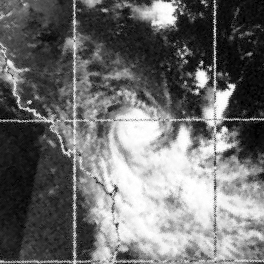
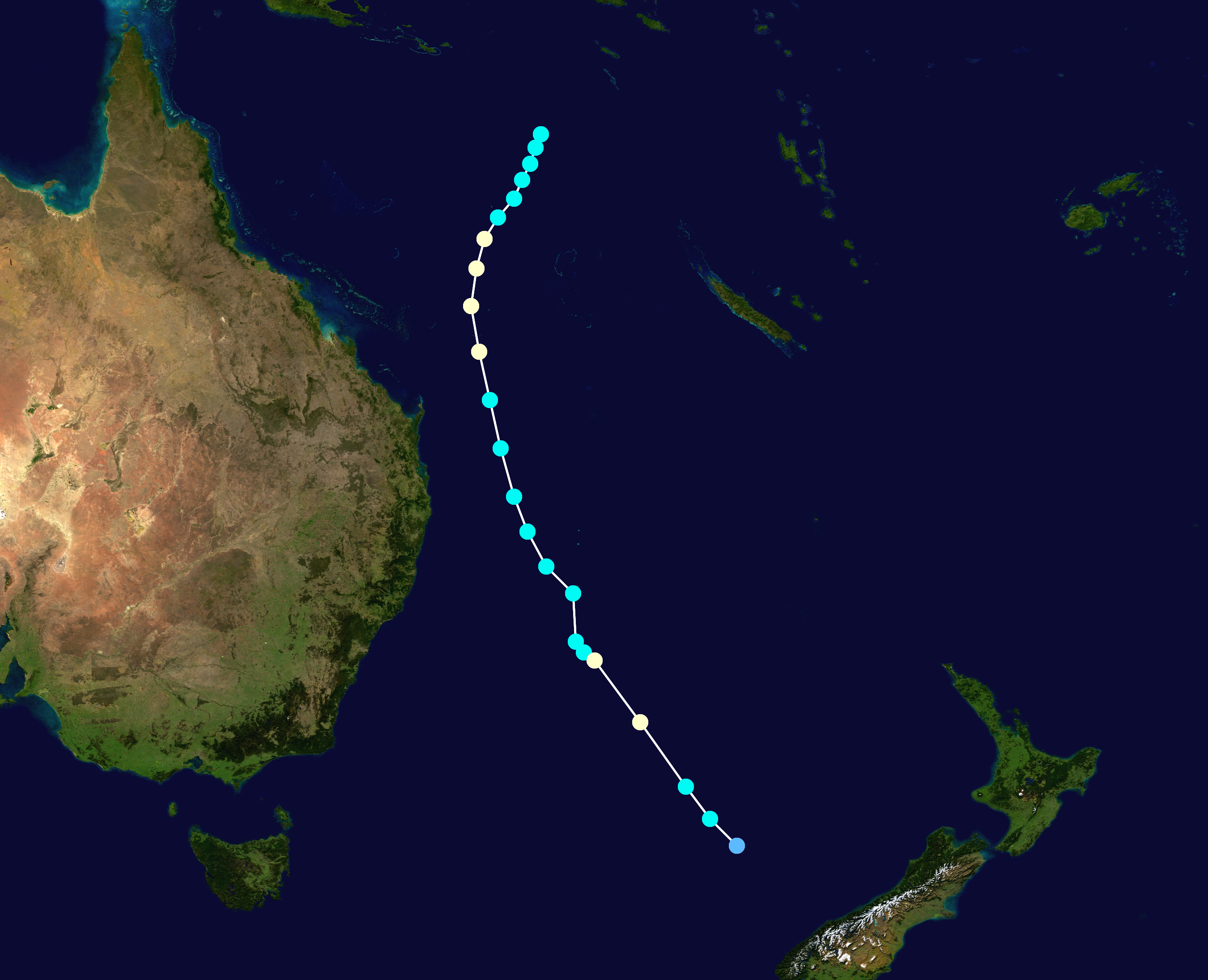
- Duration: 24 February – 1 March
- Peak intensity: 120 km/h (75 mph) (10-min); 975 hPa (mbar)

Tropical Cyclone Kirsty developed southwest of the Solomon Islands on 24 February. Heading generally southward, Kirsty dissipated well east of New South Wales on 1 March.

=== Severe Tropical Cyclone Leah ===
- Category 3 severe tropical cyclone (Australian scale)
- Category 1 tropical cyclone (SSHWS)
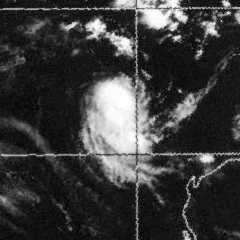
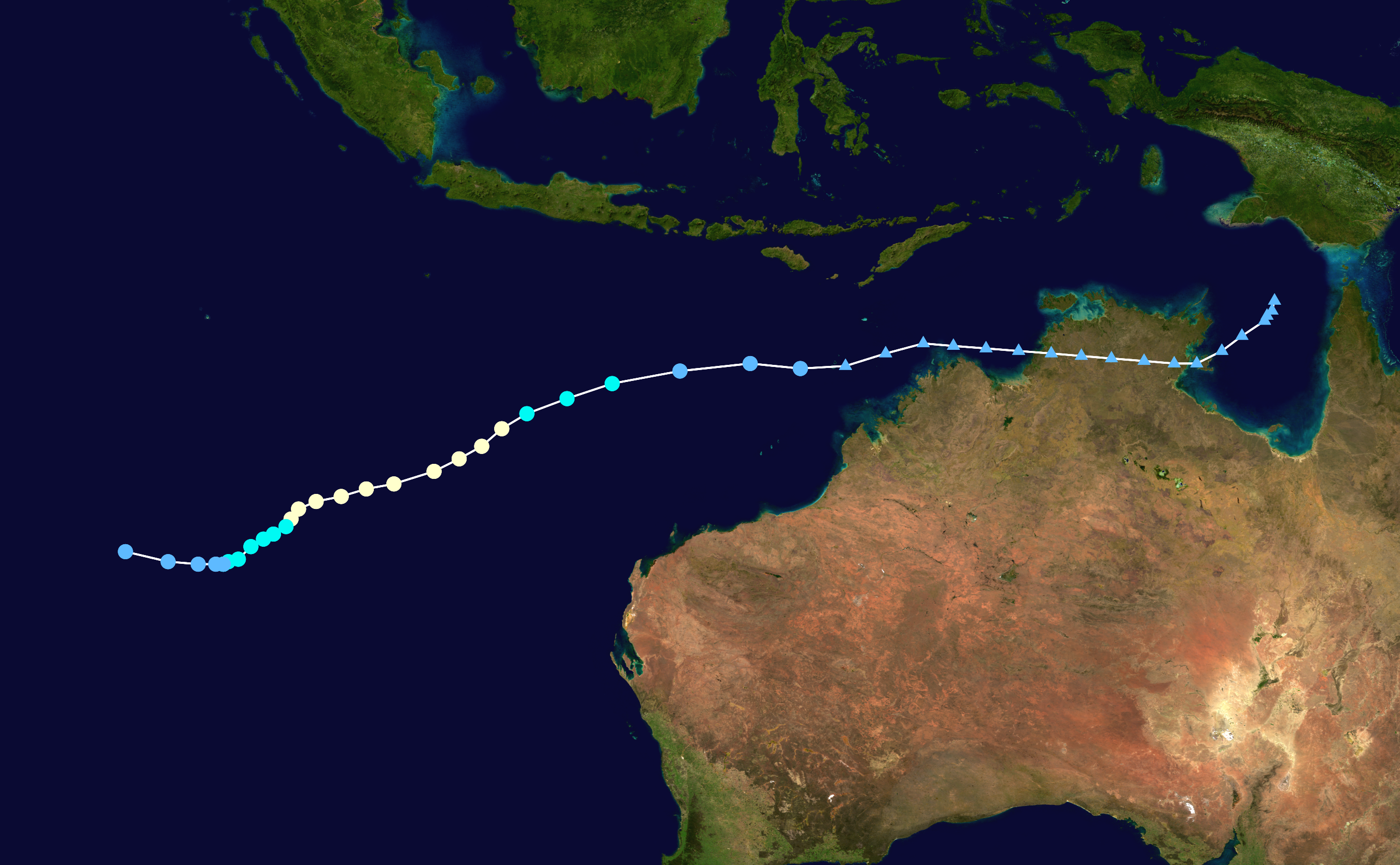
- Duration: 27 February – 11 March
- Peak intensity: 120 km/h (75 mph) (10-min); 973 hPa (mbar)

The next system, Cyclone Leah, formed near the coast of Western Australia on 27 February. Moving southwestward, Leah eventually dissipated on 11 March.

=== Severe Tropical Cyclone Madge ===
- Category 4 severe tropical cyclone (Australian scale)
- Category 2 tropical cyclone (SSHWS)
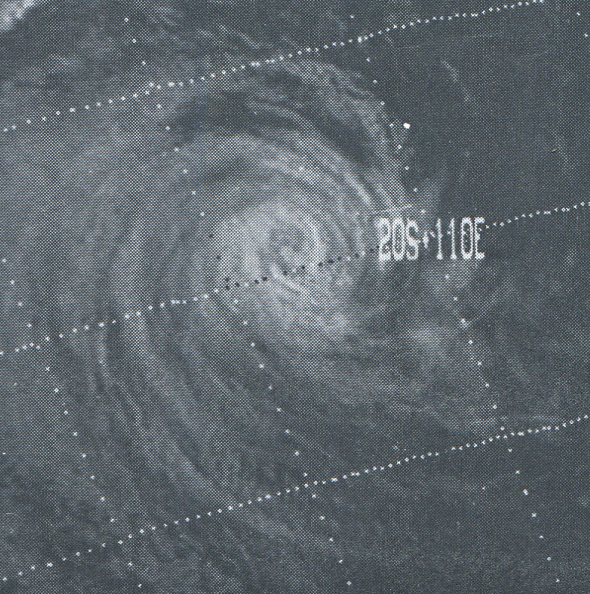
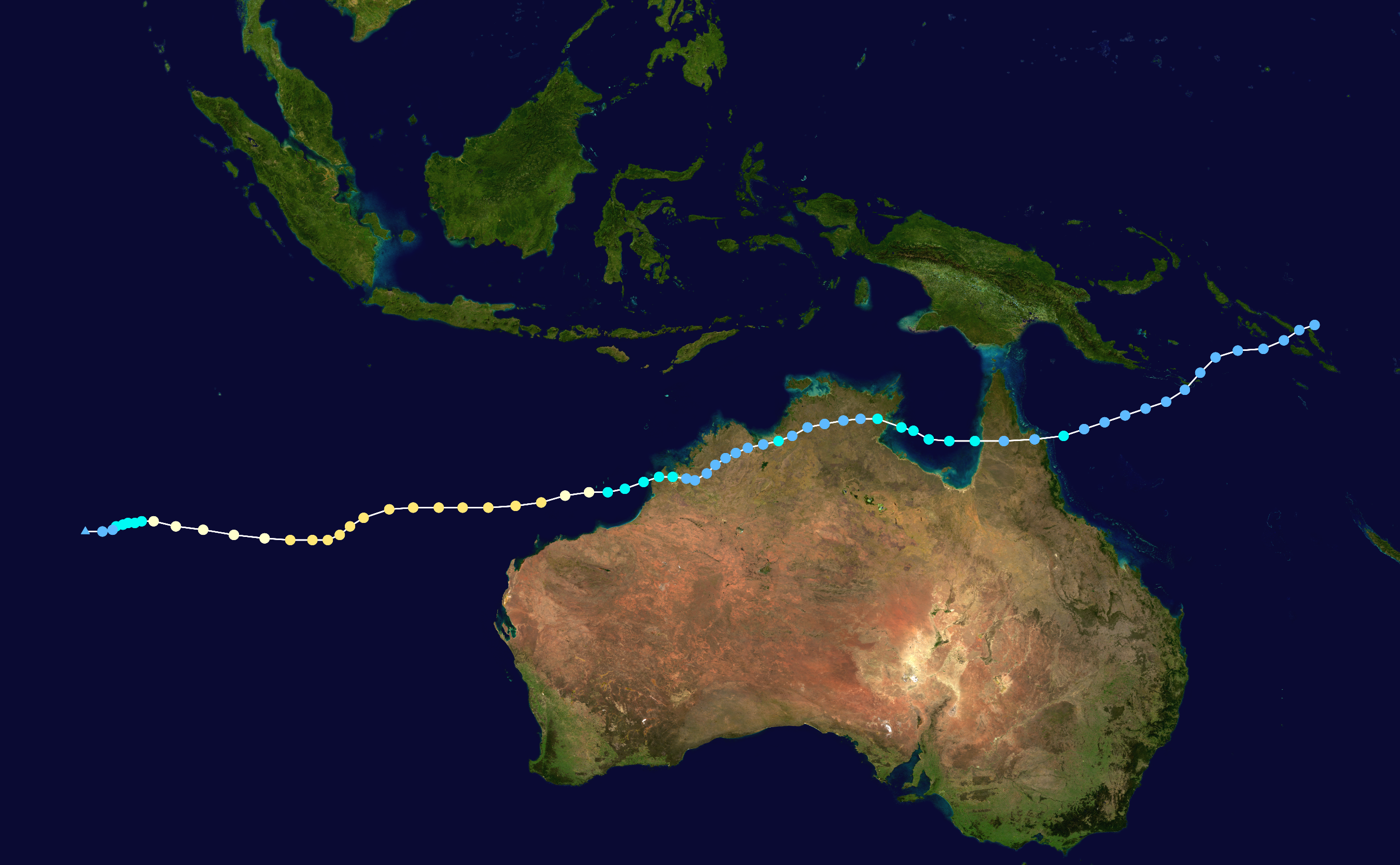
- Duration: 28 February – 18 March
- Peak intensity: 165 km/h (105 mph) (10-min); 952 hPa (mbar)

Cyclone Madge, the strongest tropical cyclone of the season, originated in the vicinity of the Solomon Islands on 28 February. Tracking west-southwestward, Madge struck the Cape York Peninsula early on 4 March. By late the following day, the cyclone made landfall near Numbulwar, Northern Territory. Moving across Northern Territory and Queensland, Madge emerged into the Indian Ocean on 10 March. The storm headed generally westward for the next several days, until dissipating on 18 March.

=== Severe Tropical Cyclone Nellie ===
- Category 3 severe tropical cyclone (Australian scale)
- Category 1 tropical cyclone (SSHWS)
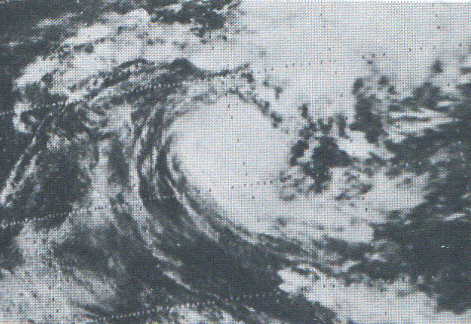
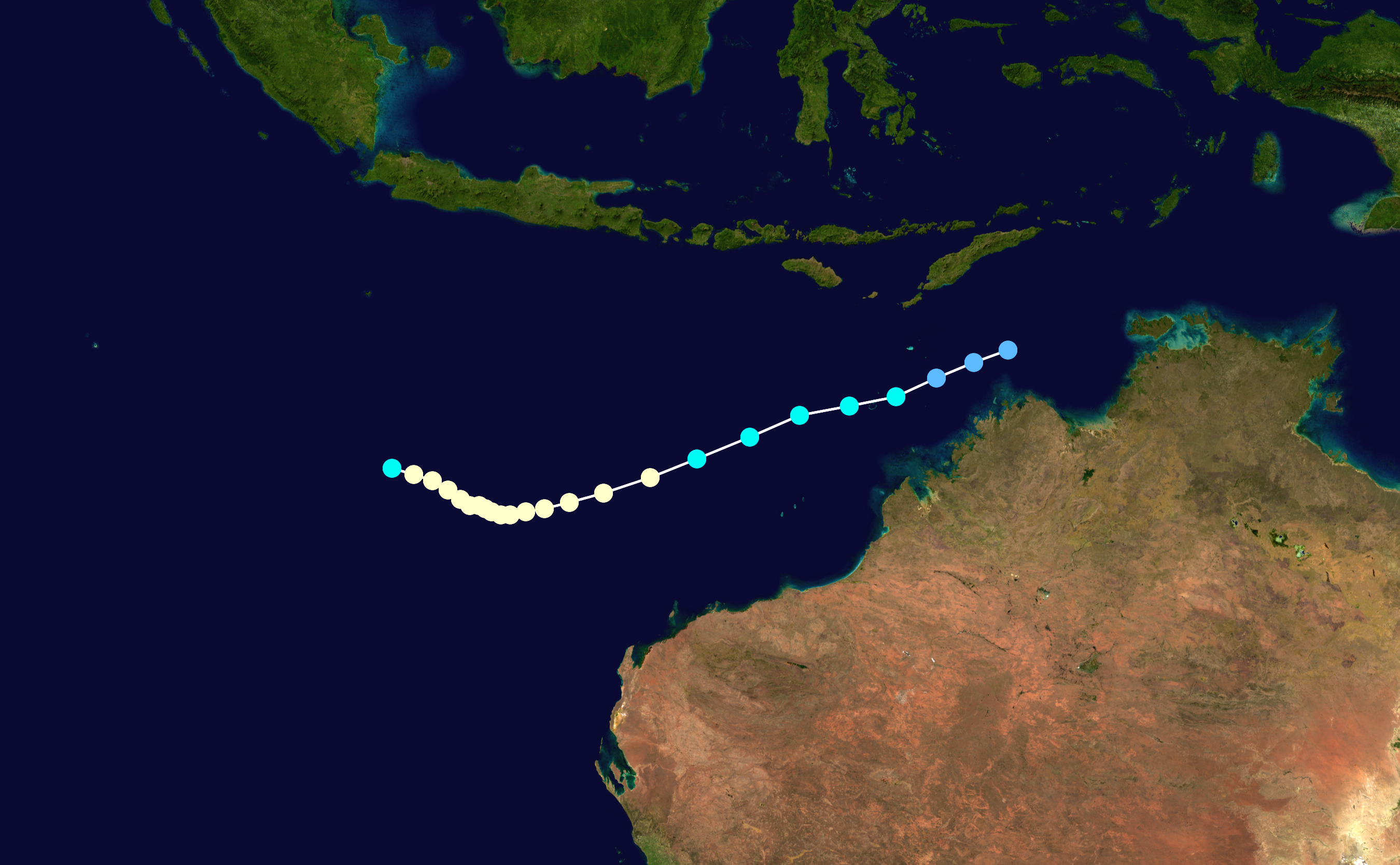
- Duration: 13 March – 23 March
- Peak intensity: 150 km/h (90 mph) (10-min); 964 hPa (mbar)

On 13 March Cyclone Nellie formed offshore Queensland. It moved generally west-southwestward before dissipated on 23 March.

=== Tropical Cyclone Bella ===
- Category 1 tropical cyclone (Australian scale)
- Tropical storm (SSHWS)
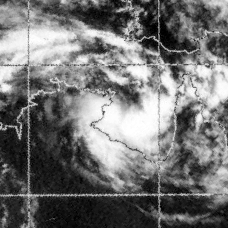
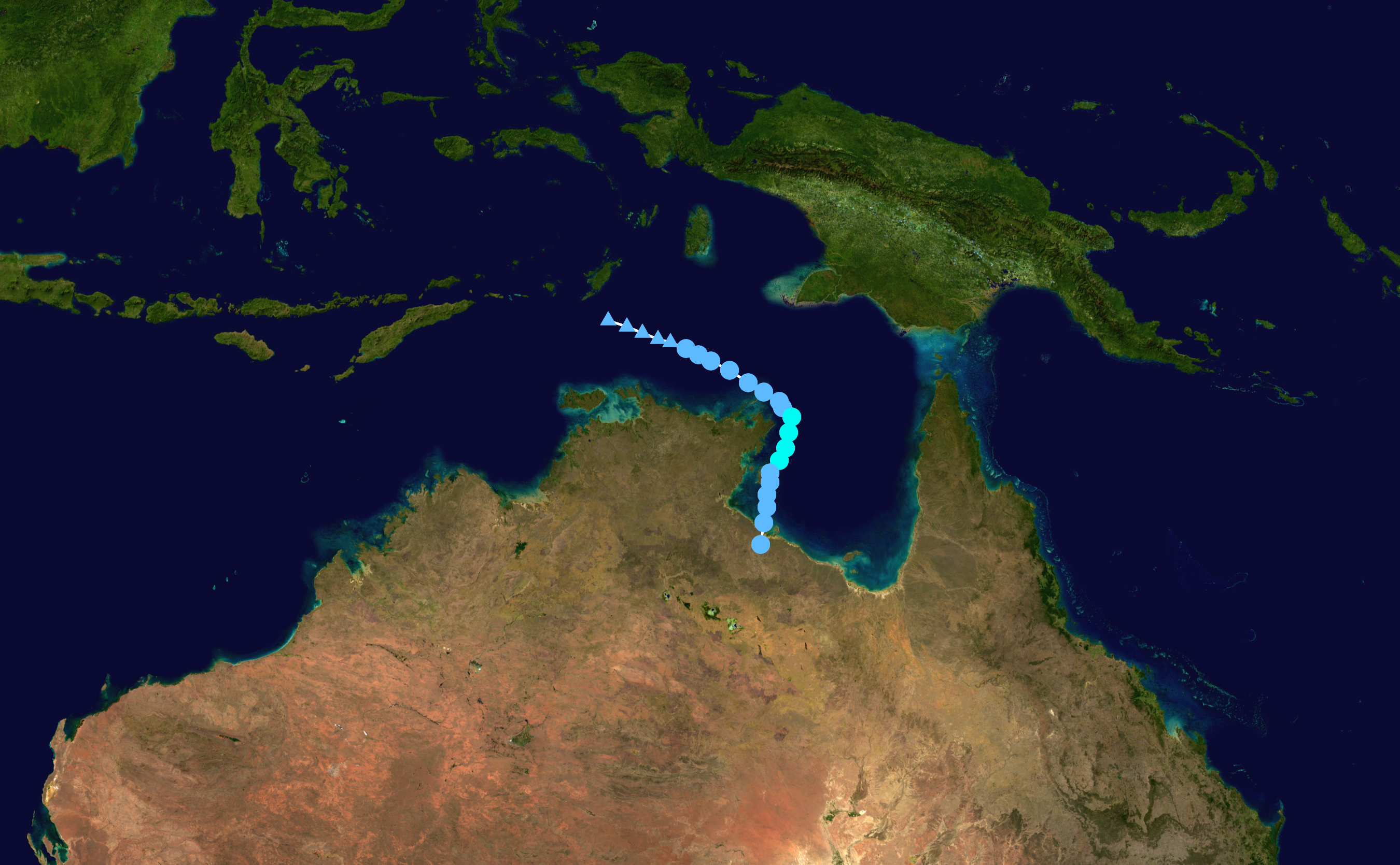
- Duration: 20 March – 25 March
- Peak intensity: 65 km/h (40 mph) (10-min); 998 hPa (mbar)

Cyclone Bella developed over the Arafura Sea on 20 March. It struck North Territory before dissipating on 25 March.

=== Tropical Cyclone Paula ===
- Category 1 tropical cyclone (Australian scale)
- Tropical storm (SSHWS)
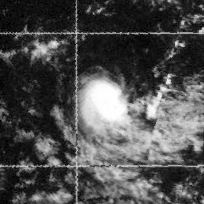
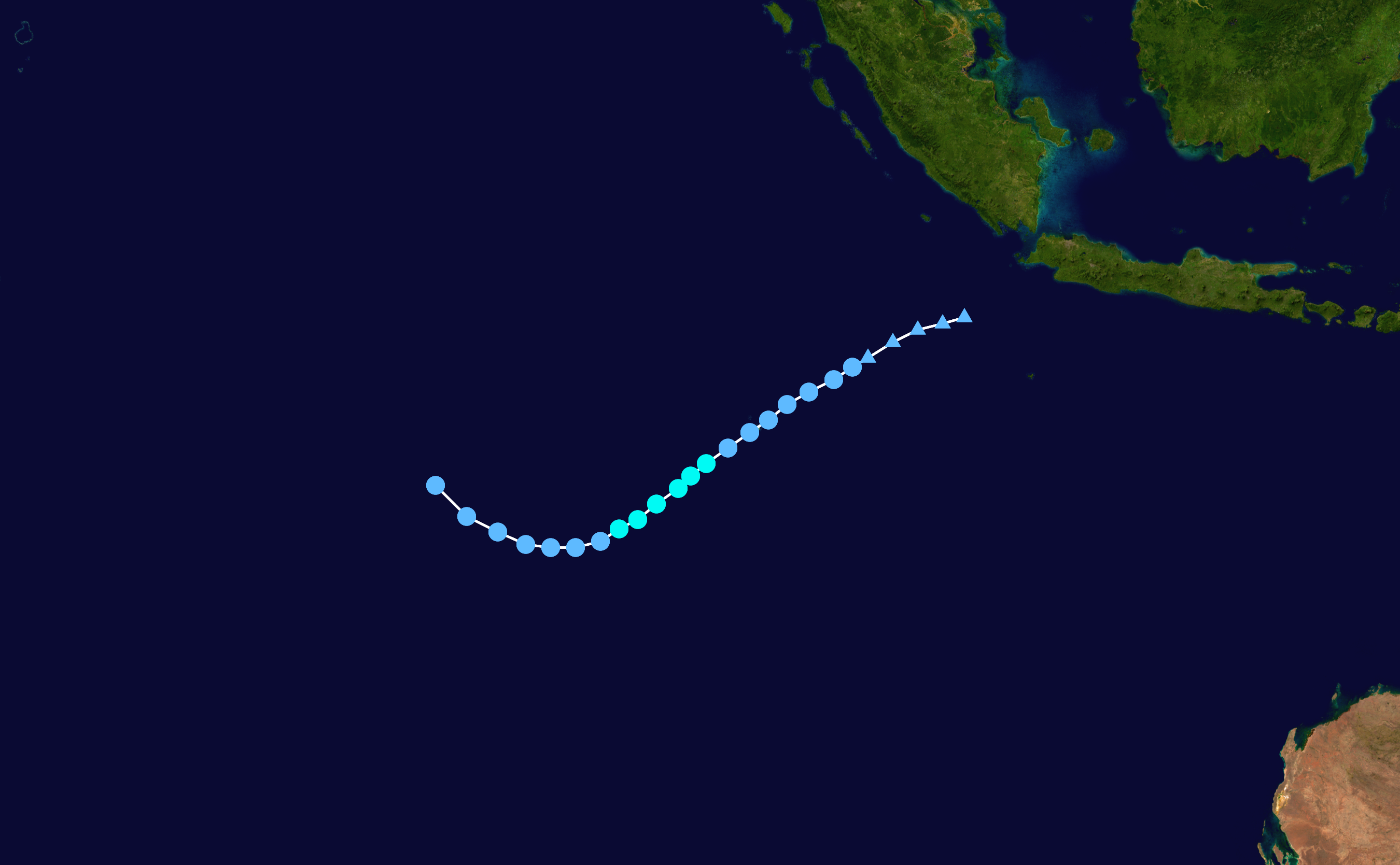
- Duration: 26 March – 1 April
- Peak intensity: 65 km/h (40 mph) (10-min); 997 hPa (mbar)

The next system, Cyclone Paula, formed southwest of Indonesia on 16 March. Paula moved southwestward and dissipated about six days later.

=== Severe Tropical Cyclone Thirteen ===
- Category 3 severe tropical cyclone (Australian scale)
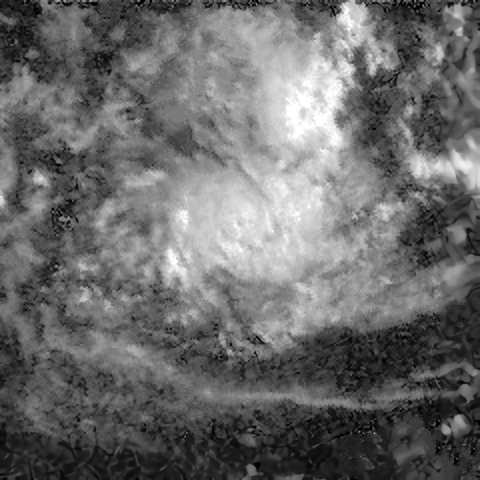
- Duration: 26 April – 29 April
- Peak intensity: 150 km/h (90 mph) (10-min); 950 hPa (mbar)

The most intense tropical cyclone of the season developed in the Banda Sea on 26 April. The storm peaked with a barometric pressure of 950 mbar (28 inHg). The storm struck the island of Flores before dissipating on 29 April. Widespread destruction of houses, schools, and bridges was reported in four of the island's districts. 53 on Flores were killed, and 21 perished in the sinking of a Timorese fishing ship, the O Arbiru. Additionally, over 1,500 fisherman were reported lost at sea. The area's remoteness kept information about the cyclone's effects from reaching the news for over a month. The storm killed a total of 1,650 people, making it the deadliest tropical cyclone recorded in the Southern Hemisphere.

=== Severe Tropical Cyclone Marcelle ===
- Category 3 severe tropical cyclone (Australian scale)
- Category 1 tropical cyclone (SSHWS)
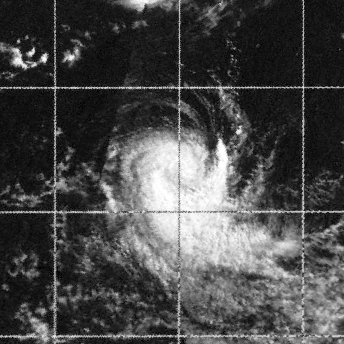
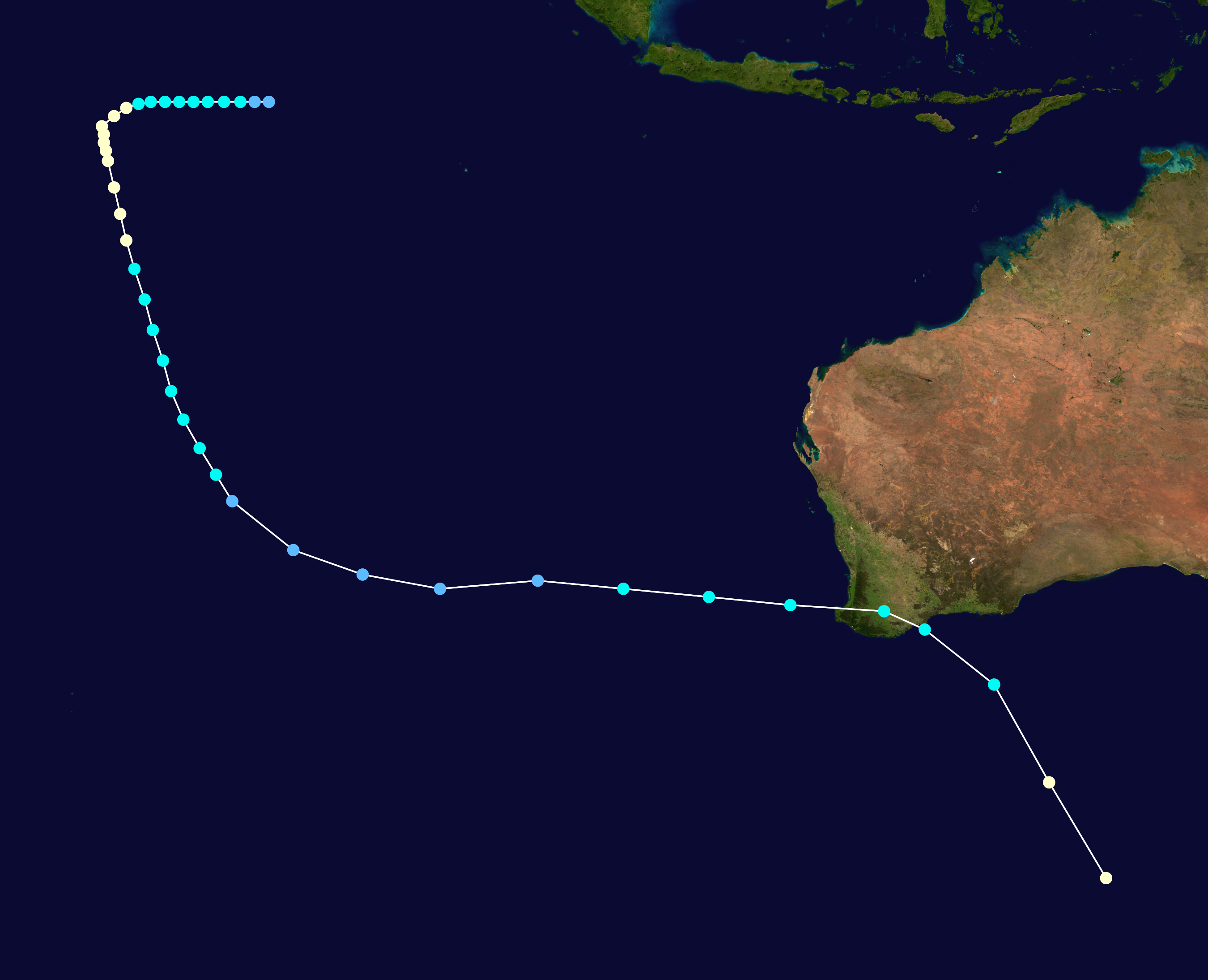
- Duration: 29 April – 9 May
- Peak intensity: 120 km/h (75 mph) (10-min); 975 hPa (mbar)

Marcelle, the final tropical cyclone of the season, developed well west of Indonesia on 29 April. The storm struck near Busselton, Western Australia late on 7 May. Marcelle dissipated well south of Australia about two days later.

== See also ==
- 1892 Mauritius cyclone – The third-deadliest cyclone recorded in the Southern Hemisphere
- Cyclone Mahina – The deadliest tropical cyclone in Australian history; also potentially the most intense cyclone in the southern hemisphere
- Cyclone Idai – The second-deadliest cyclone recorded in the Southern Hemisphere; devastated the nations east of the Mozambique Channel in 2019
- Cyclone Leon–Eline – A very long-lived and deadly tropical cyclone that devastated Mozambique in 2000
- 1970 Bhola cyclone – The deadliest tropical cyclone recorded worldwide
- Atlantic hurricane seasons: 1972, 1973
- Eastern Pacific hurricane seasons: 1972, 1973
- Western Pacific typhoon seasons: 1972, 1973
- North Indian Ocean cyclone seasons: 1972, 1973
