= 1973 Pacific typhoon season =

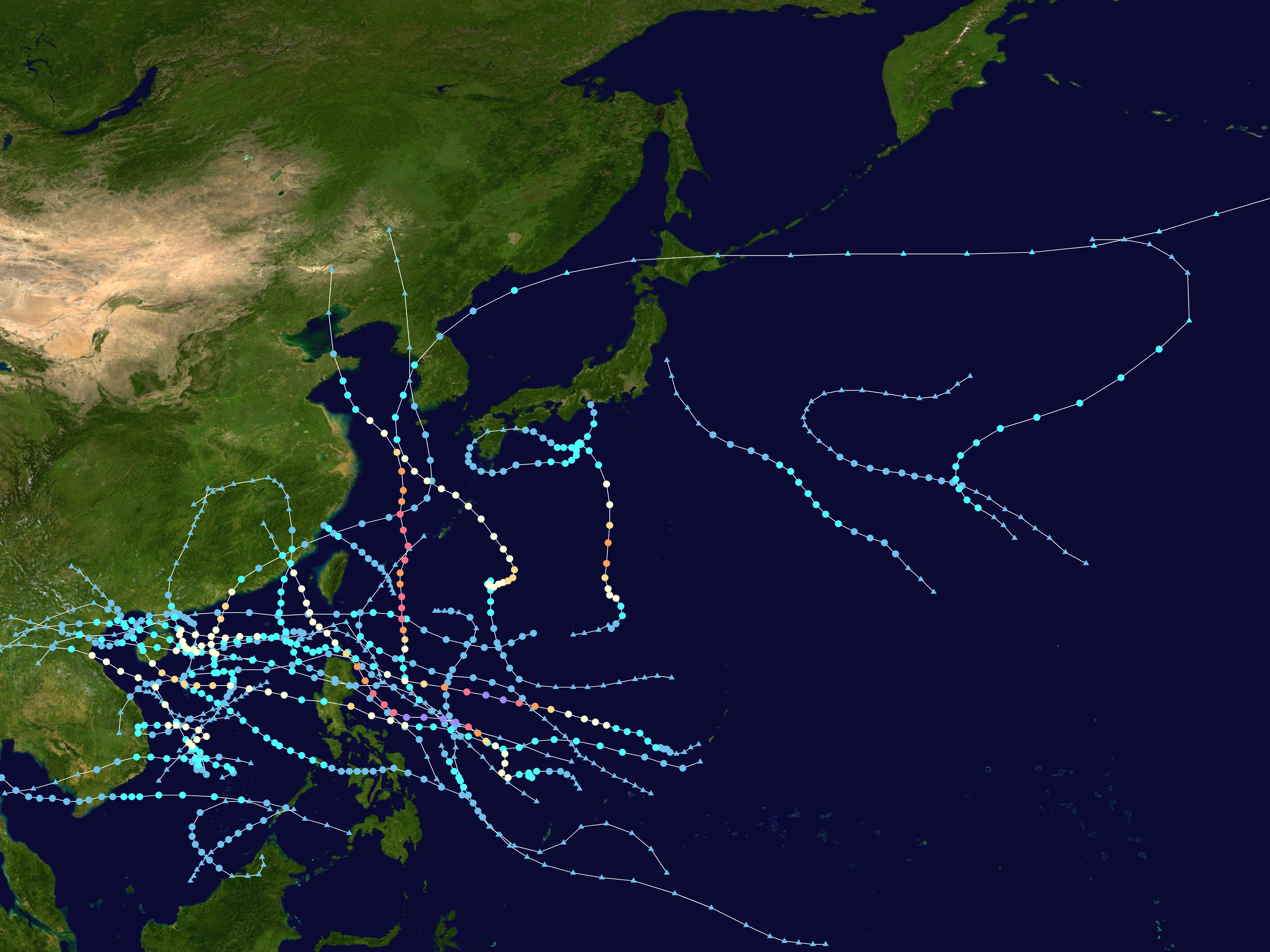
- Season summary map

Seasonal boundaries
- First system formed: May 12, 1973
- Last system dissipated: December 27, 1973

Strongest storm
- Name: Nora
  - Maximum winds: 295 km/h (185 mph) (1-minute sustained)
  - Lowest pressure: 875 hPa (mbar)

Seasonal statistics
- Total depressions: 39
- Total storms: 21
- Typhoons: 12
- Very strong typhoons: 3 (unofficial)
- Total fatalities: >1,011
- Total damage: > $7 million (1973 USD)

Related articles
- 1973 Atlantic hurricane season; 1973 Pacific hurricane season; 1973 North Indian Ocean cyclone season

The 1973 Pacific typhoon season, in comparison to the two years preceding it, was a below average season, with only 21 named storms and 12 typhoons forming. It had the sixth-latest start on record in the basin. However, it featured Typhoon Nora, which ties Typhoon June of 1975 for the second strongest typhoon on record. It has no official bounds; it ran year-round in 1973, but most tropical cyclones tend to form in the northwestern Pacific Ocean between June and December. These dates conventionally delimit the period of each year when most tropical cyclones form in the northwestern Pacific Ocean.

The scope of this article is limited to the Pacific Ocean, north of the equator and west of the International Date Line. Storms that form east of the date line and north of the equator are called hurricanes; see 1973 Pacific hurricane season. Tropical Storms formed in the entire west pacific basin were assigned a name by the Joint Typhoon Warning Center. Tropical depressions in this basin have the "W" suffix added to their number. Tropical depressions that enter or form in the Philippine area of responsibility are assigned a name by the Philippine Atmospheric, Geophysical and Astronomical Services Administration or PAGASA. This can often result in the same storm having two names.

== Systems ==
25 tropical depressions formed this year in the Western Pacific, of which 21 became tropical storms. 12 storms reached typhoon intensity, of which 3 reached super typhoon strength.

=== Severe Tropical Storm Wilda (Atring) ===
- Severe tropical storm (JMA)
- Tropical storm (SSHWS)
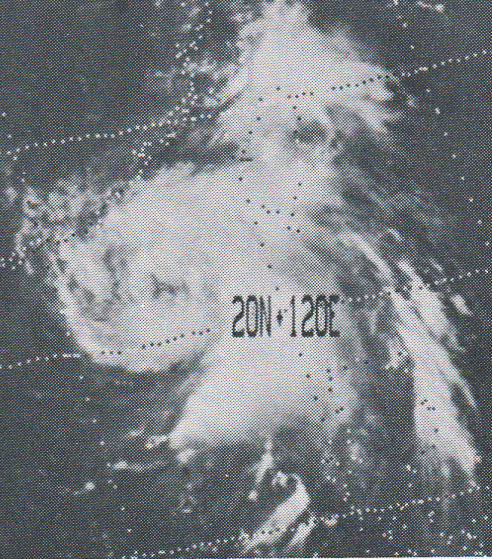
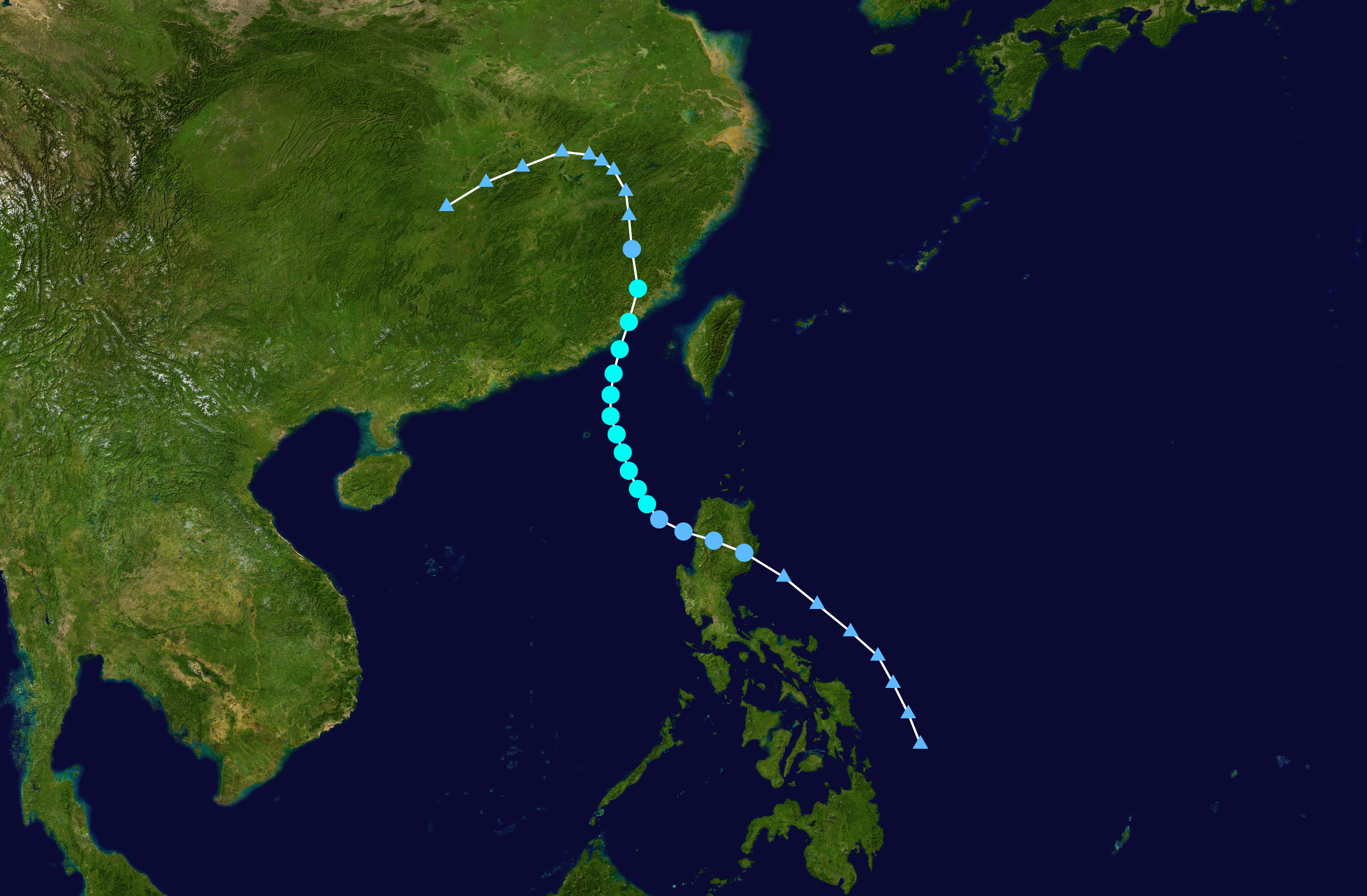
- Duration: June 28 – July 6
- Peak intensity: 110 km/h (70 mph) (1-min); 980 hPa (mbar)

Tropical Storm Wilda formed as a disturbance east of the Philippines. It traveled northwest and became a tropical depression as it made landfall on Luzon on June 30. It crossed the island, and became a tropical storm as it entered the South China Sea on 1 July. It traveled north and made landfall in southern China on the 3rd. The remnants of Wilda dissipated inland a few days later.

=== Typhoon Anita ===
- Typhoon (JMA)
- Category 1-equivalent typhoon (SSHWS)
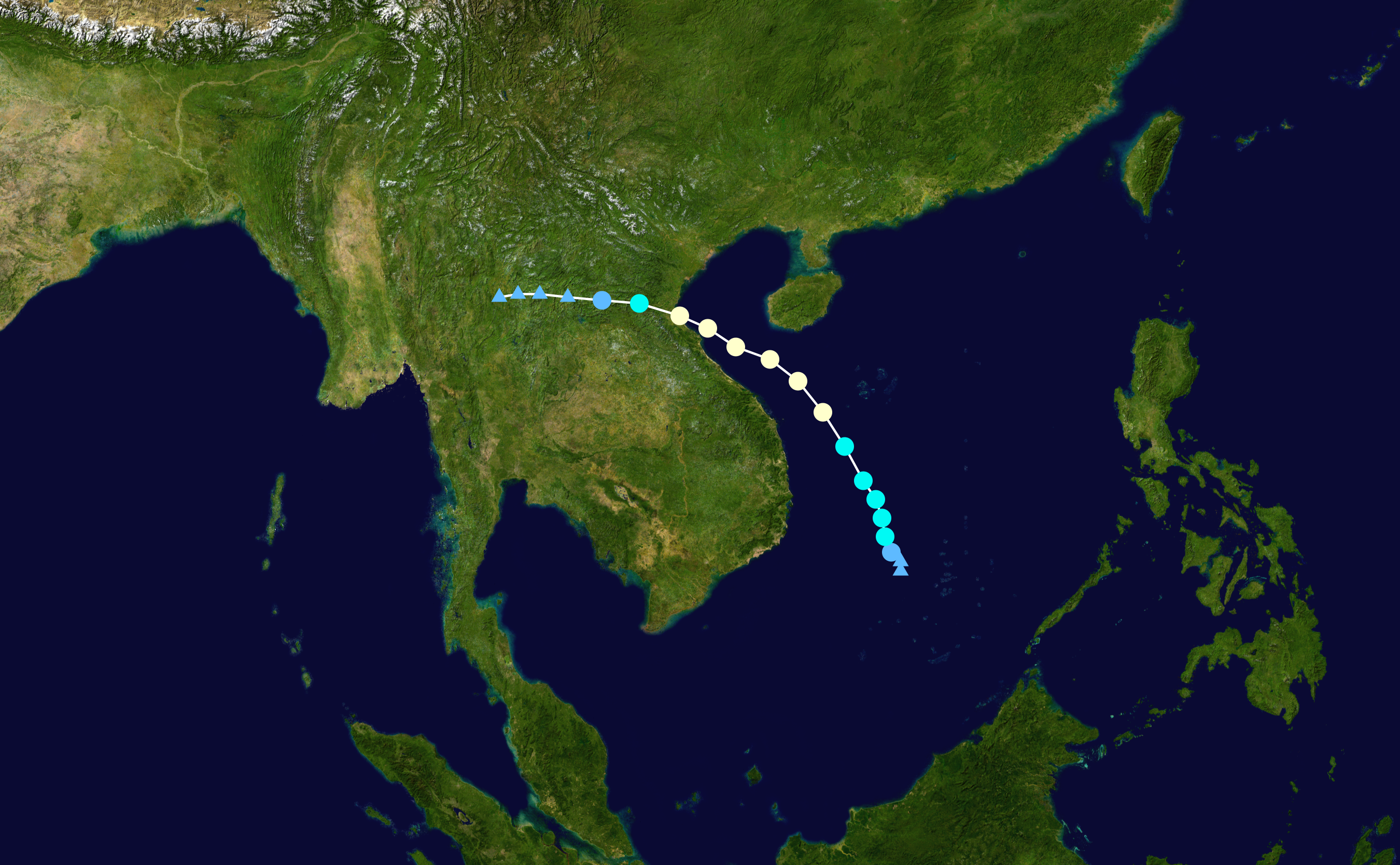
- Duration: July 4 – July 10
- Peak intensity: 130 km/h (80 mph) (1-min); 980 hPa (mbar)

Typhoon 'Anita' developed over the southern part of the South China Sea and degenerated into a low pressure area over North Vietnam.

=== Typhoon Billie (Bining) ===
- Typhoon (JMA)
- Category 4-equivalent typhoon (SSHWS)
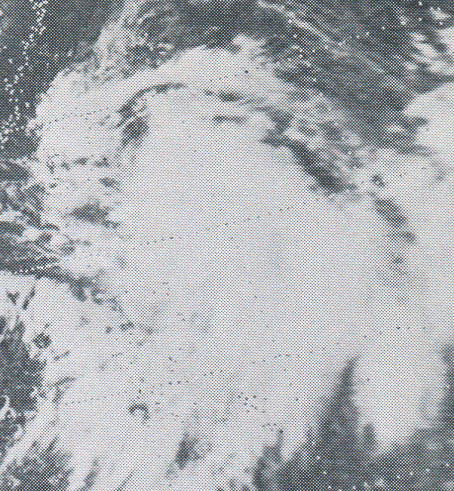
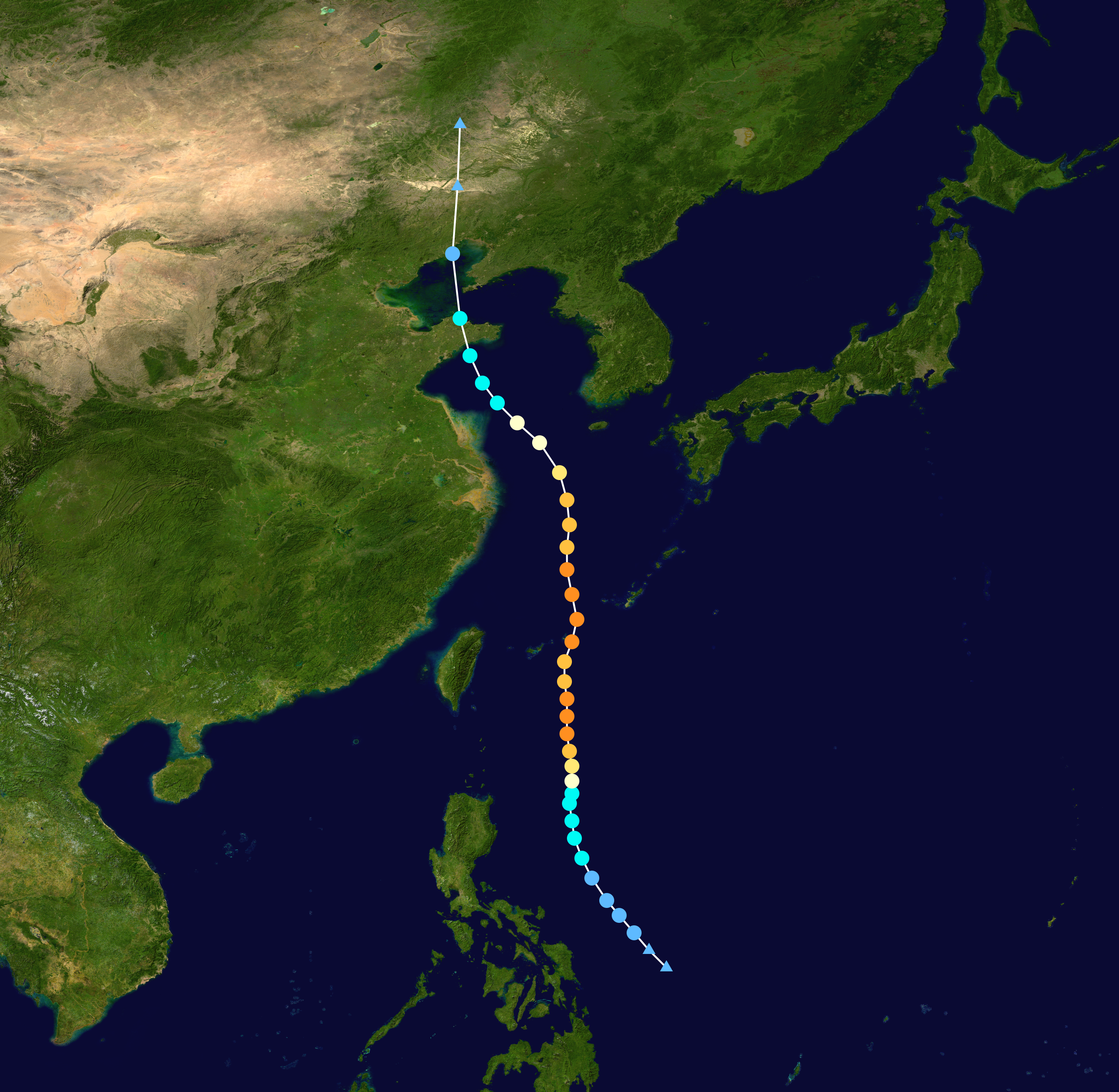
- Duration: July 11 – July 19
- Peak intensity: 240 km/h (150 mph) (1-min); 915 hPa (mbar)

Tropical Storm Billie, which developed on July 12 east of the Philippines, rapidly strengthened on the 14th and 15th to a 150 mph super typhoon. It tracked due north, fluctuating in intensity for the next 3 days. A building ridge over the Sea of Japan forced Billie to the northwest, where it weakened greatly, first to a tropical storm on the 18th, then to a tropical depression on the 19th as it passed over northeastern China. The storm dissipated on the 20th.

=== Typhoon Dot ===
- Typhoon (JMA)
- Category 2-equivalent typhoon (SSHWS)
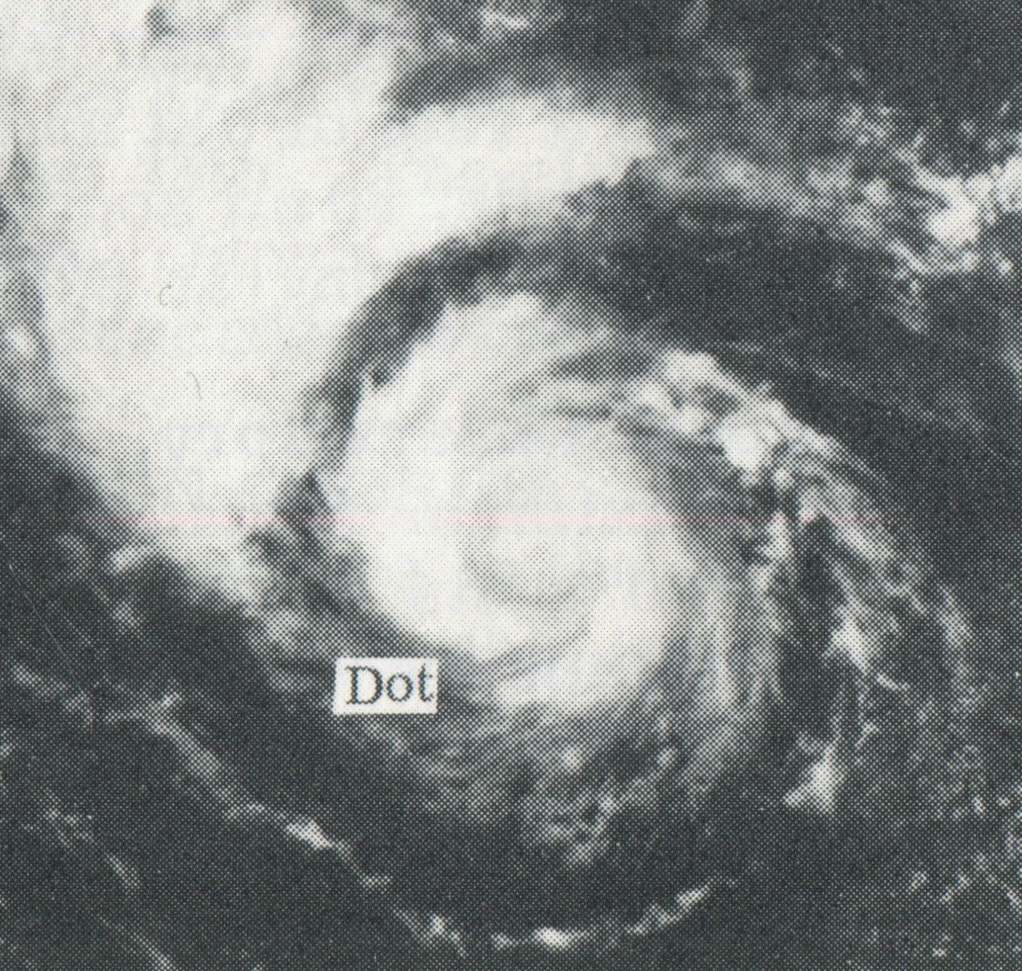
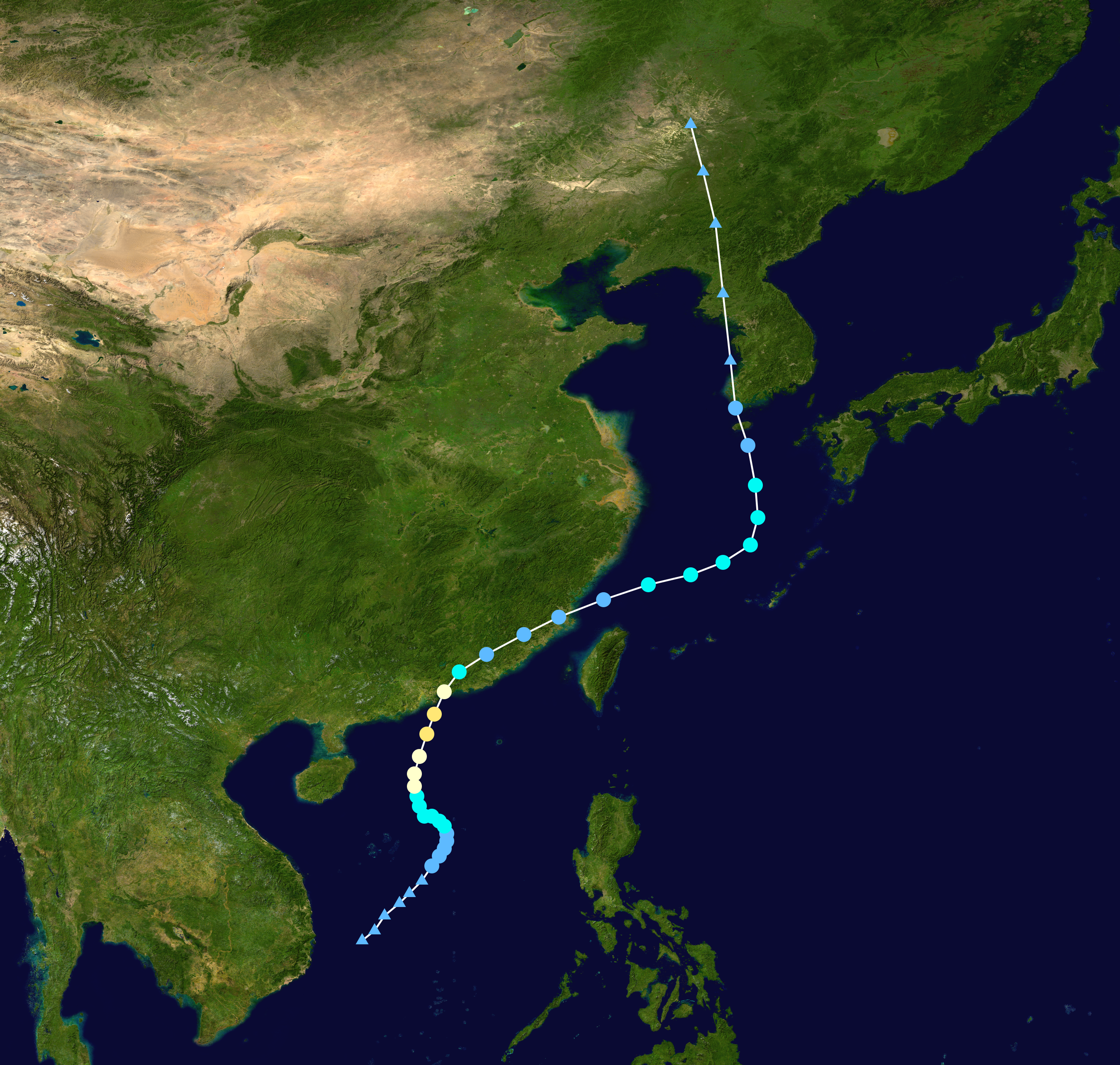
- Duration: July 11 – July 21
- Peak intensity: 155 km/h (100 mph) (1-min); 975 hPa (mbar)

Typhoon Dot struck Hong Kong causing sustained storm force winds, killing one person.

=== Severe Tropical Storm Clara ===
- Severe tropical storm (JMA)
- Tropical storm (SSHWS)
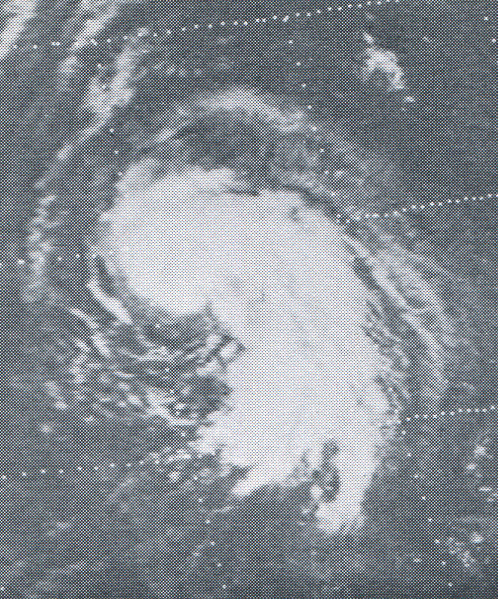
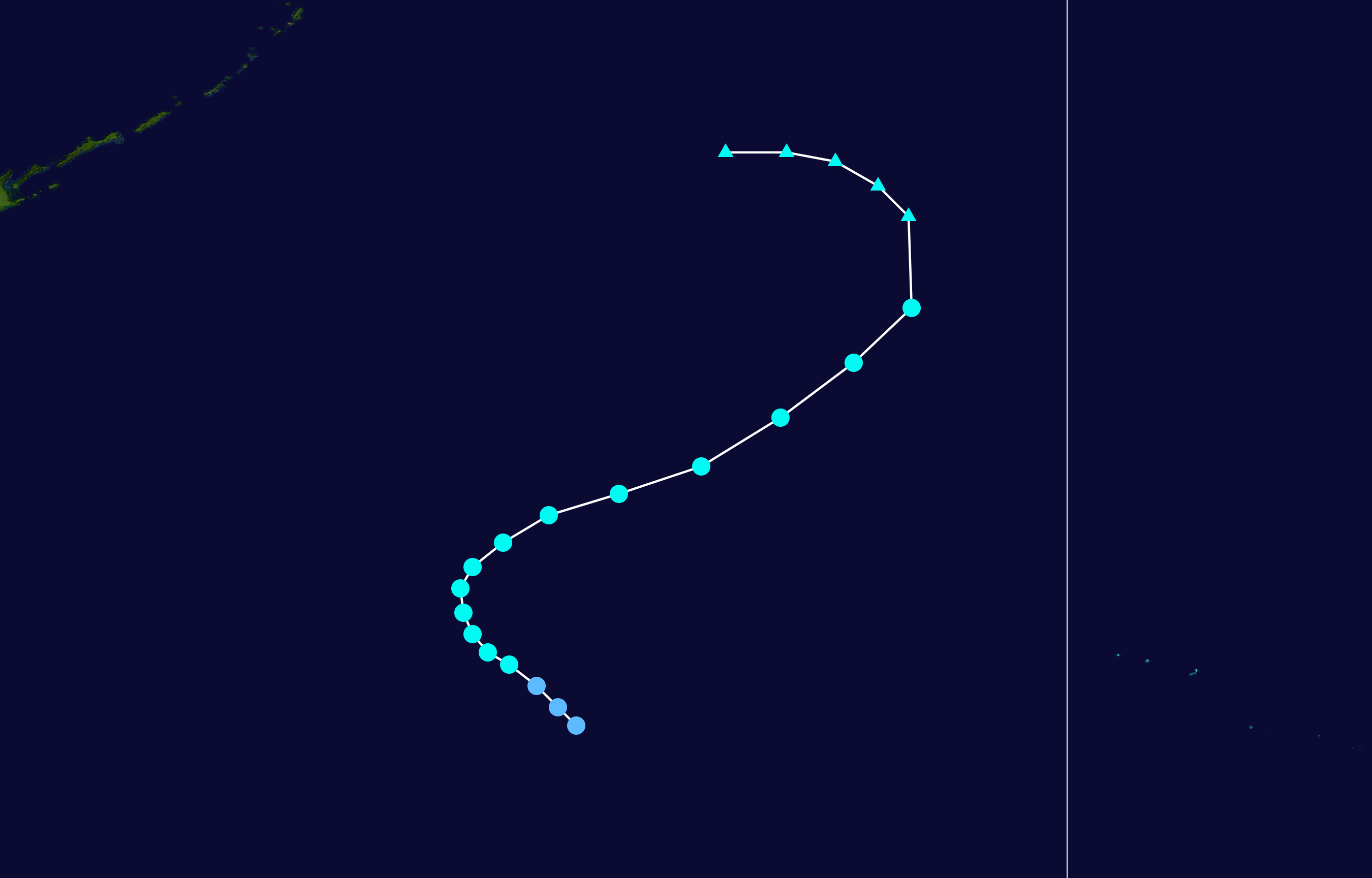
- Duration: July 11 – July 15
- Peak intensity: 100 km/h (65 mph) (1-min); 985 hPa (mbar)

=== Typhoon Ellen ===
- Typhoon (JMA)
- Category 3-equivalent typhoon (SSHWS)
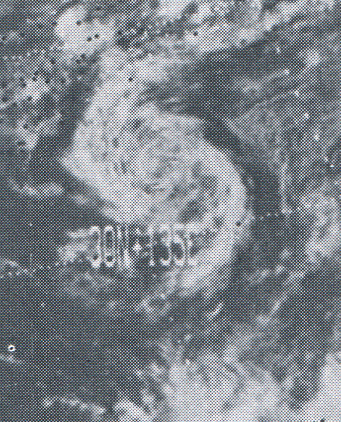
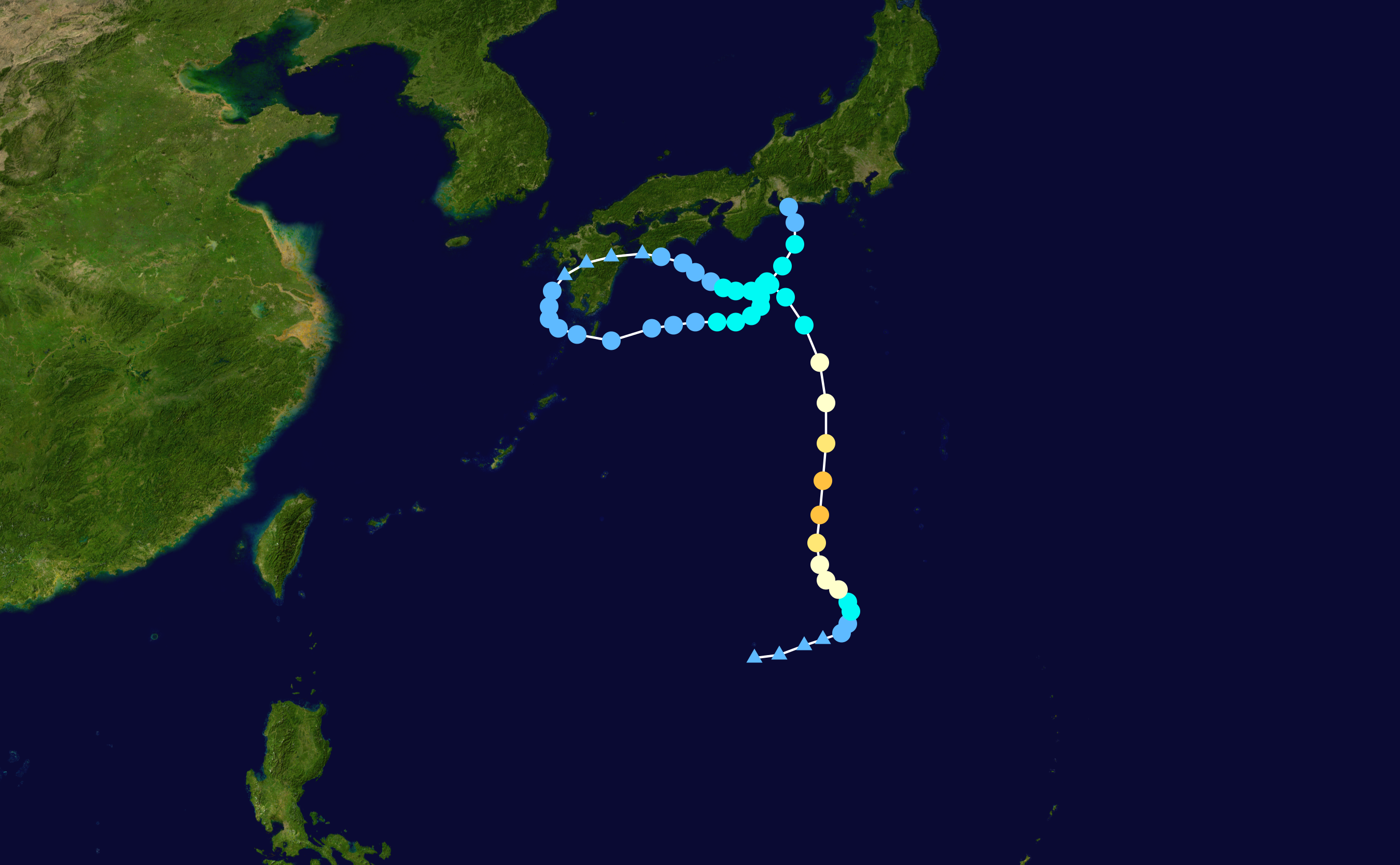
- Duration: July 16 – July 29
- Peak intensity: 195 km/h (120 mph) (1-min); 940 hPa (mbar)

Typhoon Ellen formed as a disturbance on July 16 in the vicinity of Okinotorishima, (Note: Okinotorishima is located at 20.4225°N 136.0900°E, while Ellen formed at coordinates 20.00°N 136.05°E.) from a trough in the convergence zone trailing to the southeast of Typhoon Billie the day before. Its circulation closed up by 17 July, and at 0900 JST (0000 UTC) on the following day, the JMA upgraded it to a tropical storm. Due to its sluggish, erratic movements, Shikoku and Kyushu received heavy rains between July 23 and July 26. This contributed to the above-average monthly precipitation for July 1973 in southern Shikoku and eastern Kyushu, when the rest of Japan was suffering from droughts.

=== Tropical Storm Fran (Kuring) ===
- Tropical storm (JMA)
- Tropical storm (SSHWS)
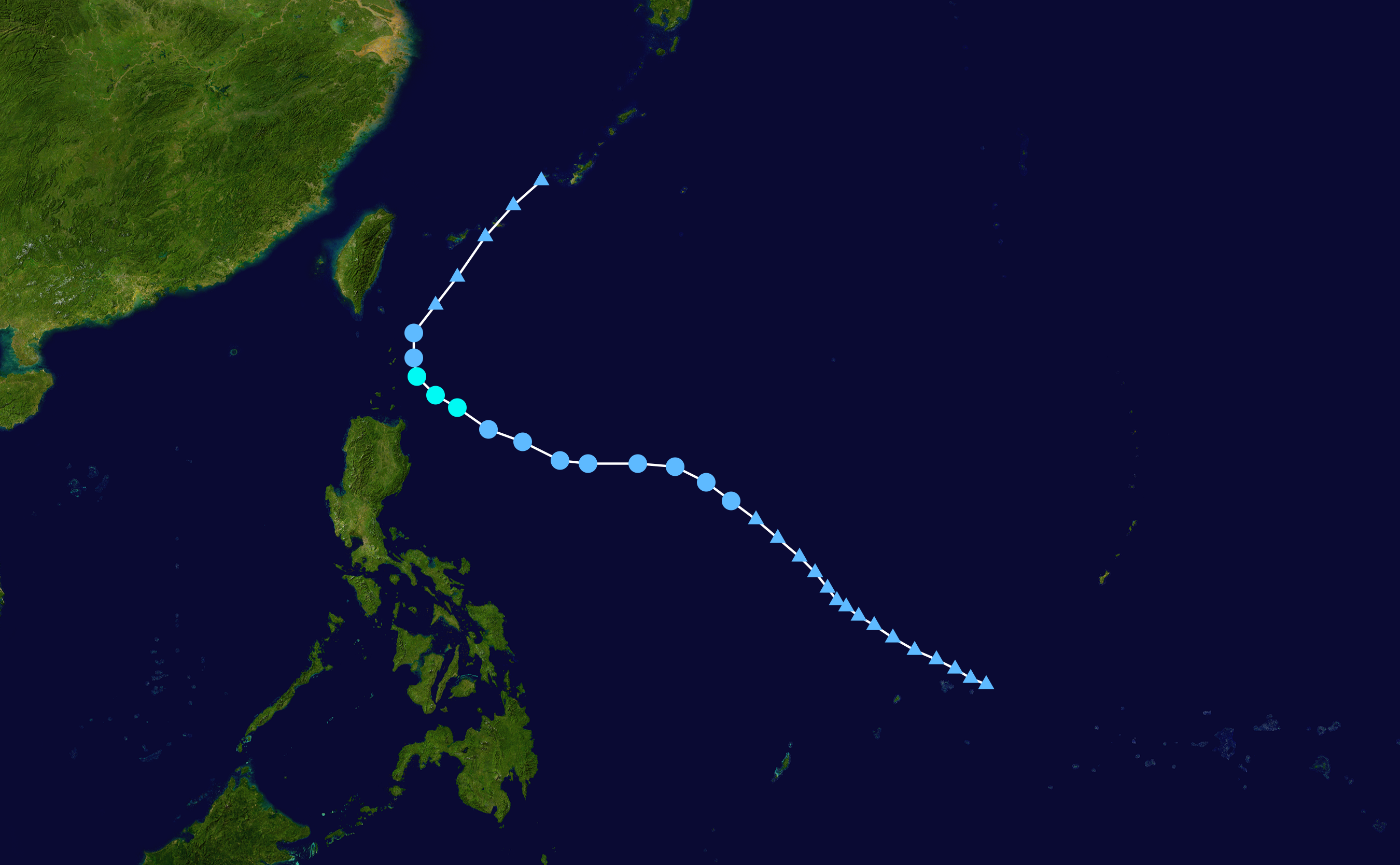
- Duration: July 23 – July 30
- Peak intensity: 75 km/h (45 mph) (1-min); 1000 hPa (mbar)

=== Typhoon Georgia ===
- Typhoon (JMA)
- Category 1-equivalent typhoon (SSHWS)
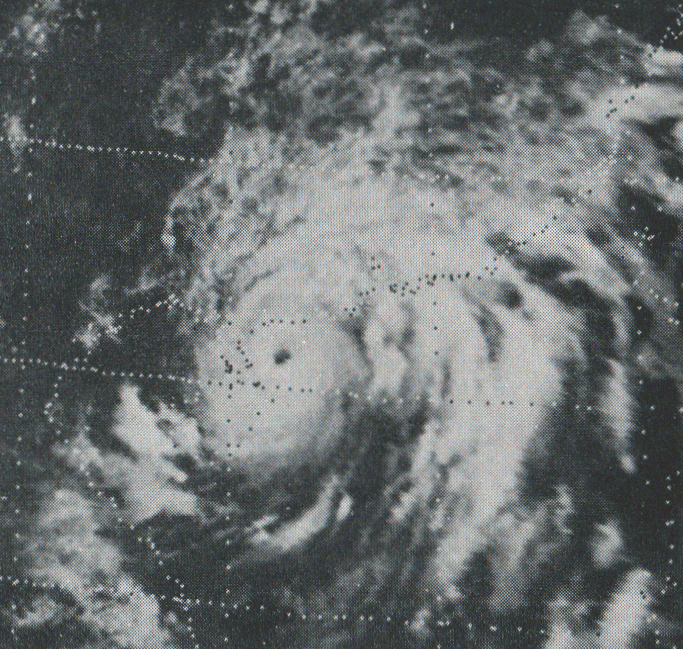
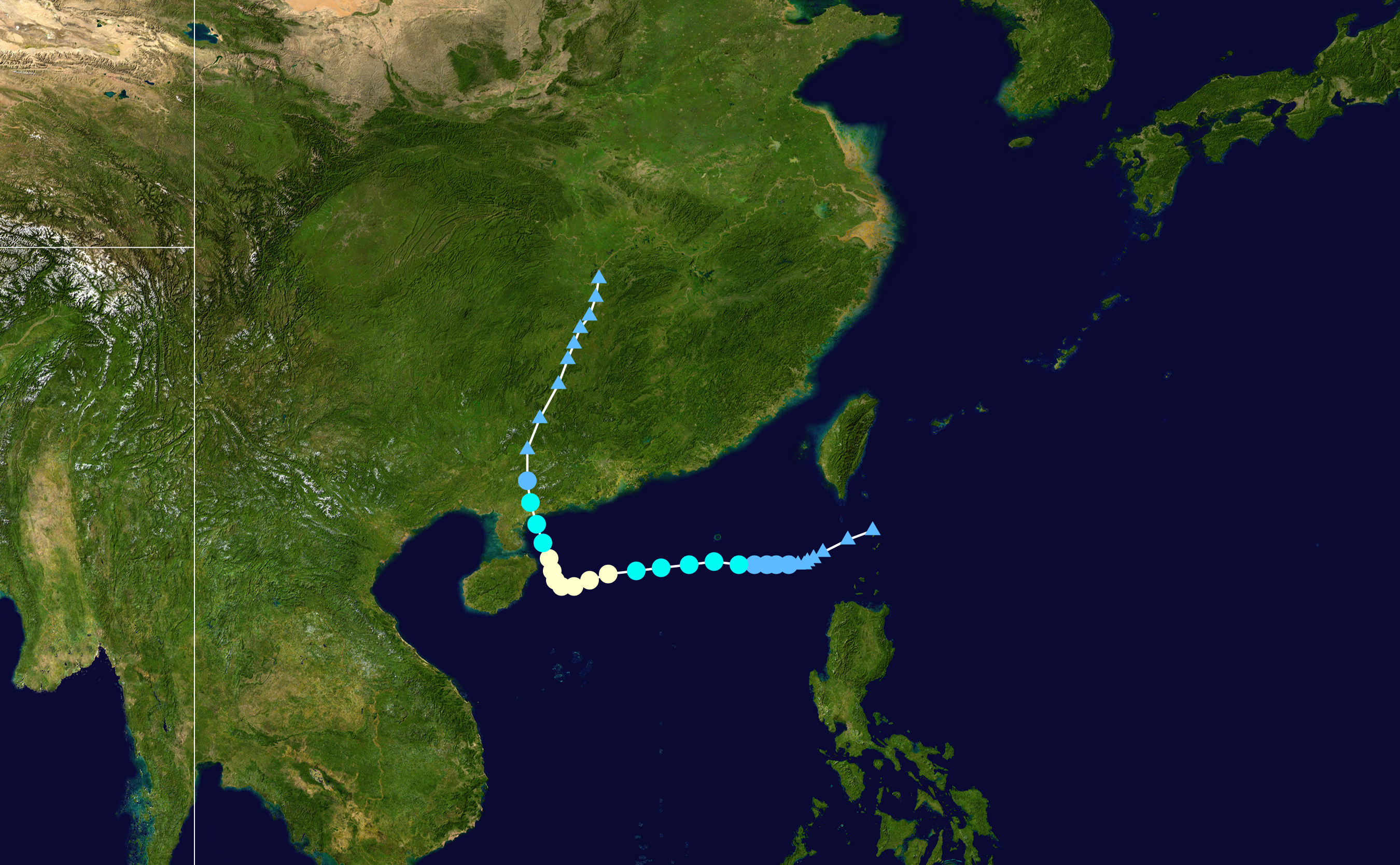
- Duration: August 5 – August 15
- Peak intensity: 130 km/h (80 mph) (1-min); 980 hPa (mbar)

=== Typhoon Iris (Daling) ===
- Typhoon (JMA)
- Category 2-equivalent typhoon (SSHWS)
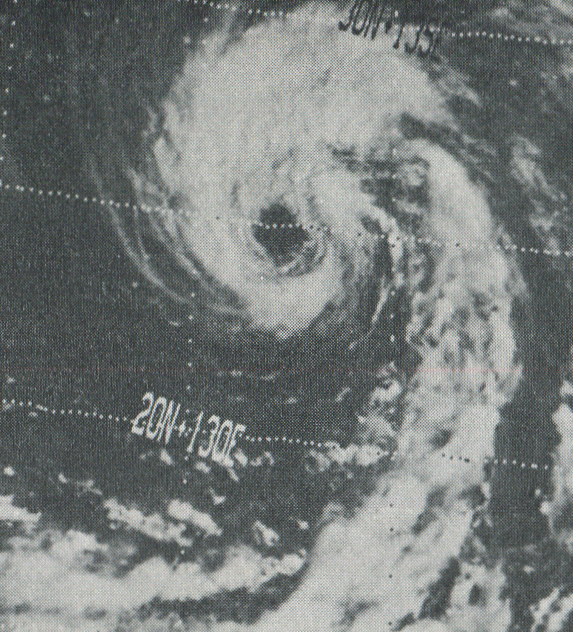
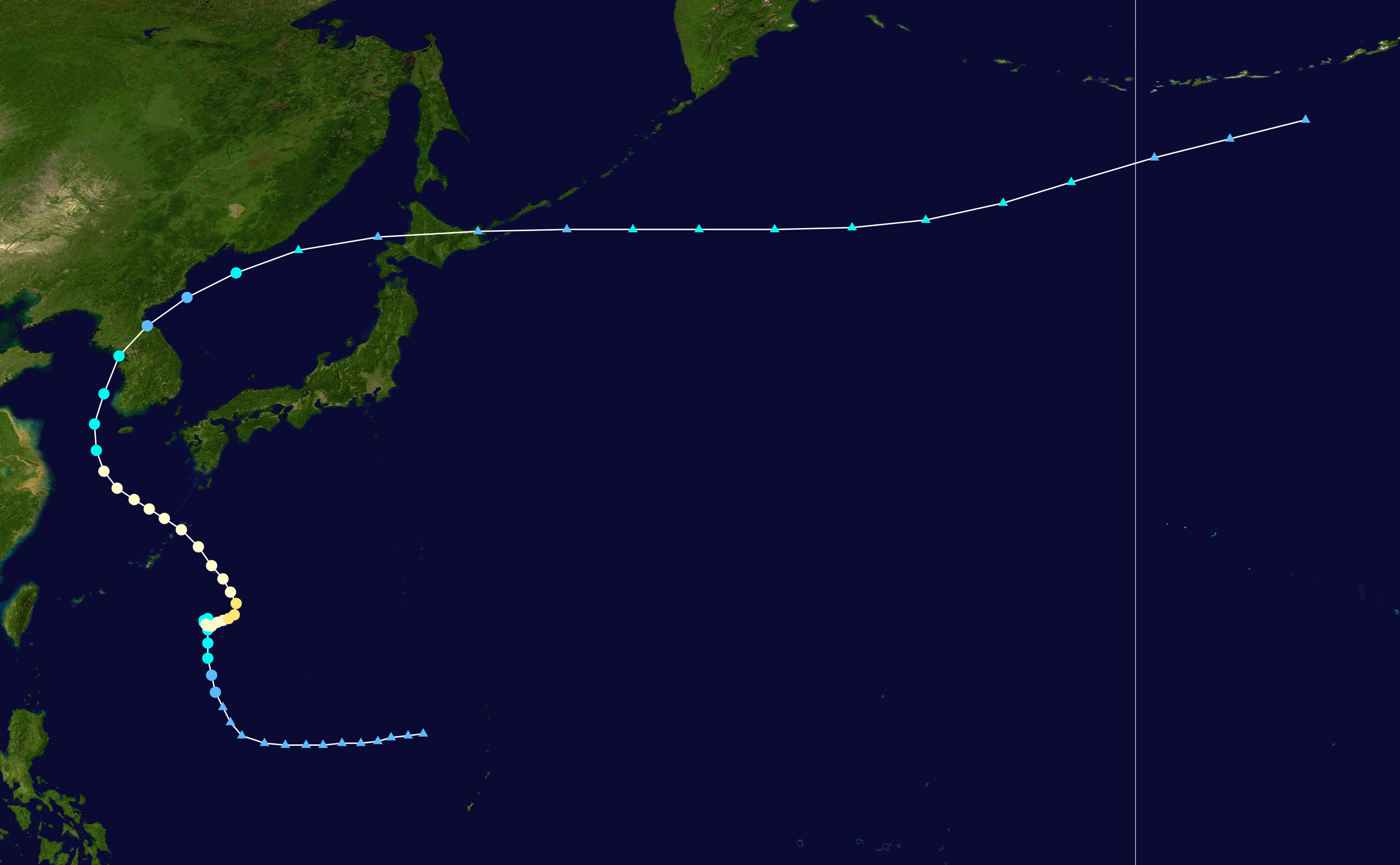
- Duration: August 6 – August 21
- Peak intensity: 155 km/h (100 mph) (1-min); 970 hPa (mbar)

Iris struck North Korea and Japan.

=== Tropical Storm Hope ===
- Tropical storm (JMA)
- Tropical storm (SSHWS)
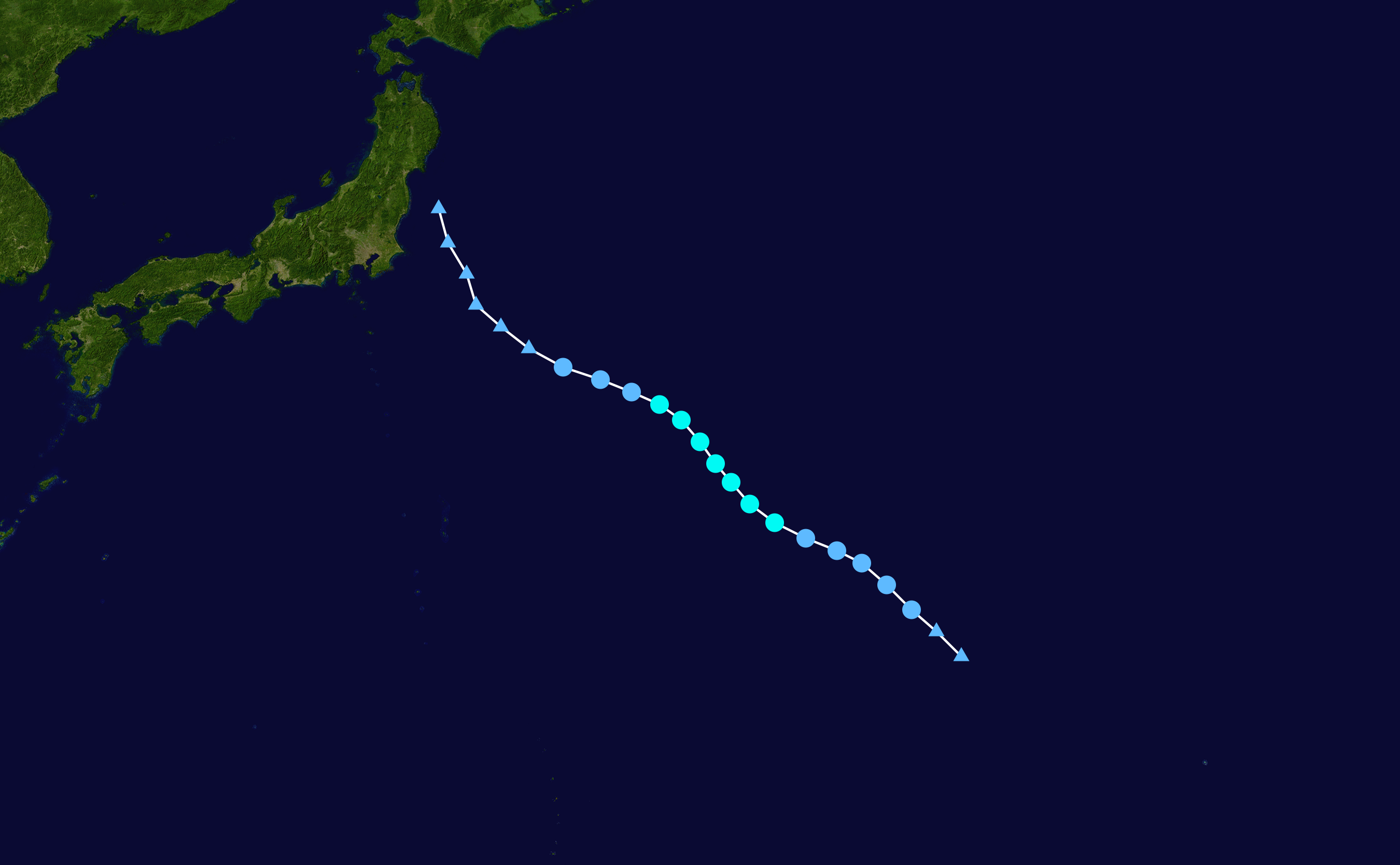
- Duration: August 8 – August 13
- Peak intensity: 85 km/h (50 mph) (1-min); 1000 hPa (mbar)

=== Tropical Depression 11W ===
- Tropical depression (JMA)
- Tropical depression (SSHWS)
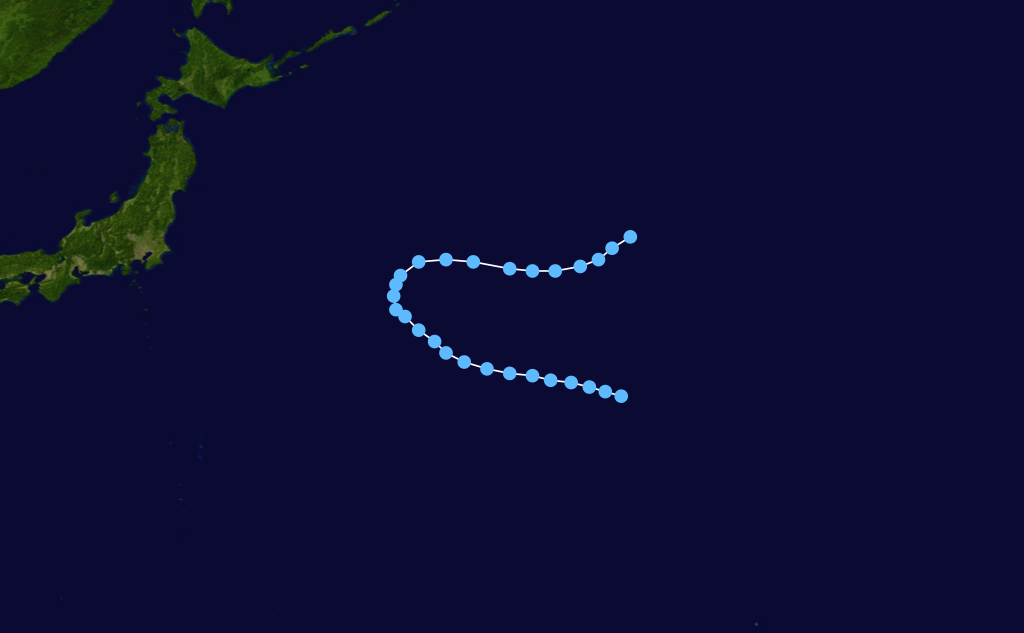
- Duration: August 10 – August 18
- Peak intensity: 55 km/h (35 mph) (1-min); 1008 hPa (mbar)

=== Tropical Storm Joan (Elang) ===
- Tropical storm (JMA)
- Tropical storm (SSHWS)
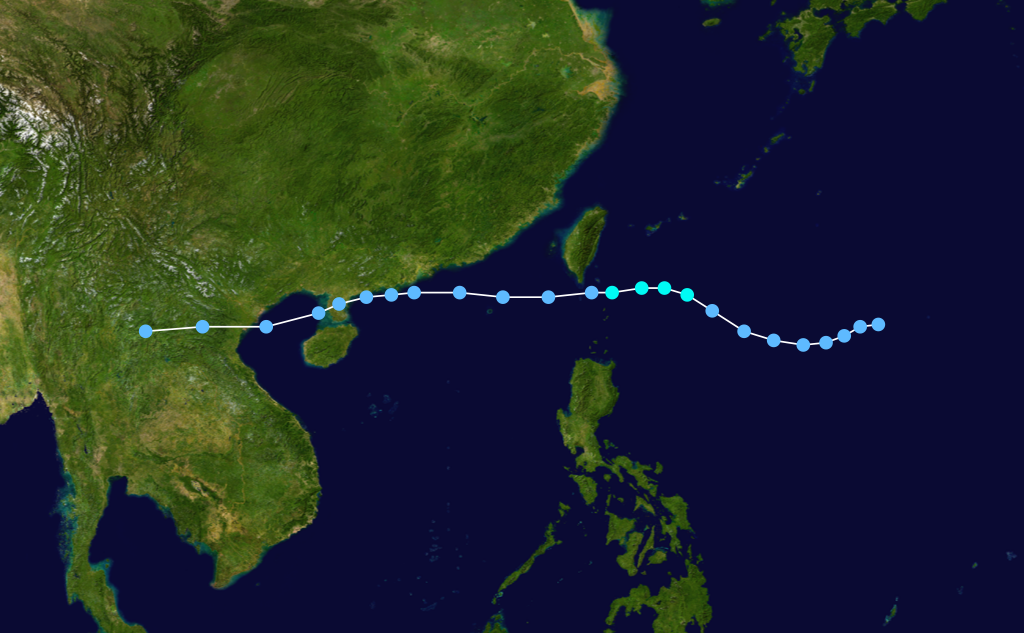
- Duration: August 18 – August 22
- Peak intensity: 85 km/h (50 mph) (1-min); 990 hPa (mbar)

=== Severe Tropical Storm Kate (Goring) ===
- Severe tropical storm (JMA)
- Tropical storm (SSHWS)
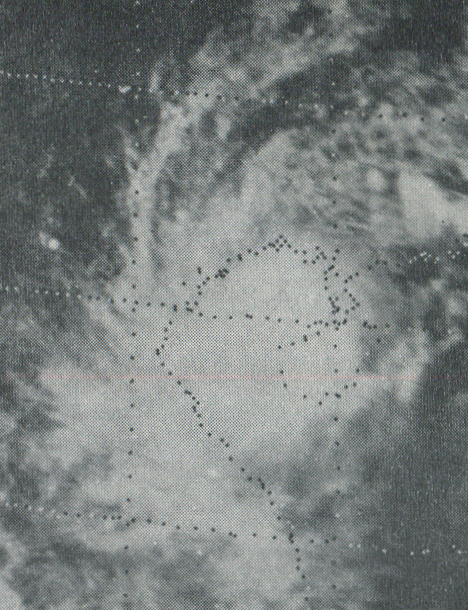
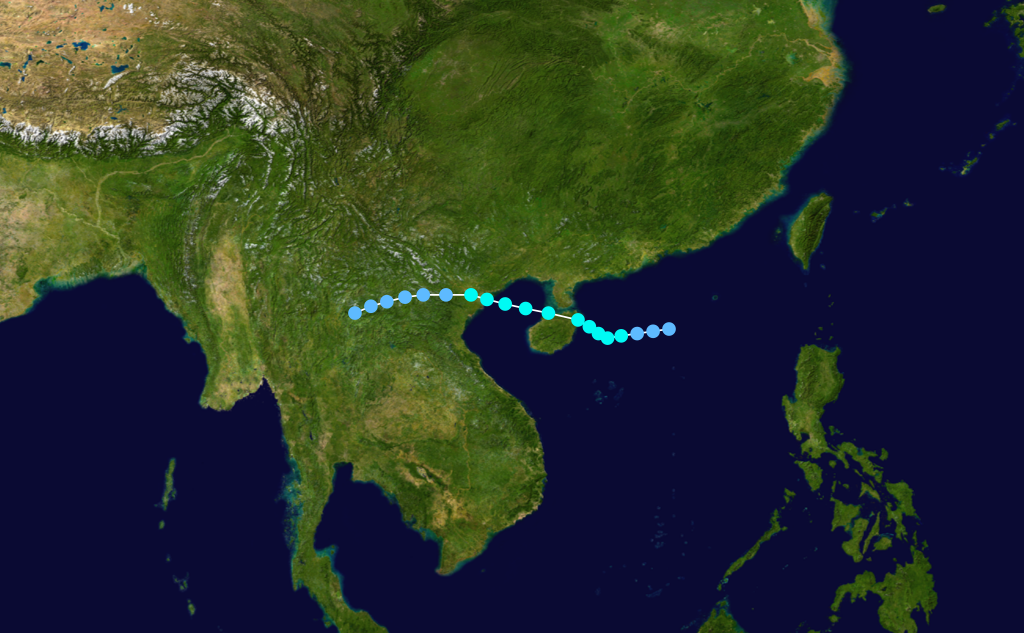
- Duration: August 20 – August 26
- Peak intensity: 110 km/h (70 mph) (1-min); 975 hPa (mbar)

=== Tropical Depression 14W ===
- Tropical depression (JMA)
- Tropical depression (SSHWS)
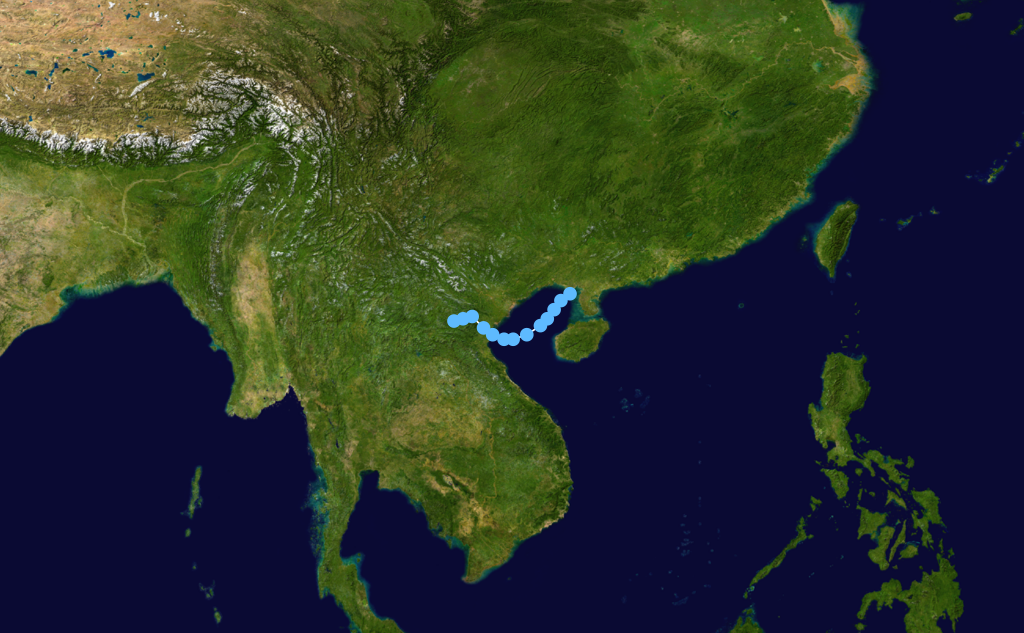
- Duration: August 28 – September 3
- Peak intensity: 55 km/h (35 mph) (1-min); 1002 hPa (mbar)

=== Typhoon Louise (Huling) ===
- Typhoon (JMA)
- Category 1-equivalent typhoon (SSHWS)
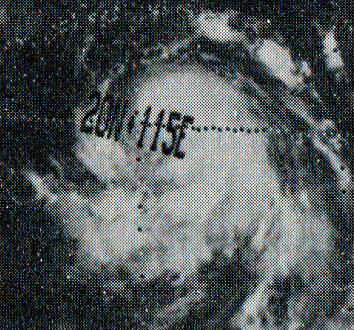
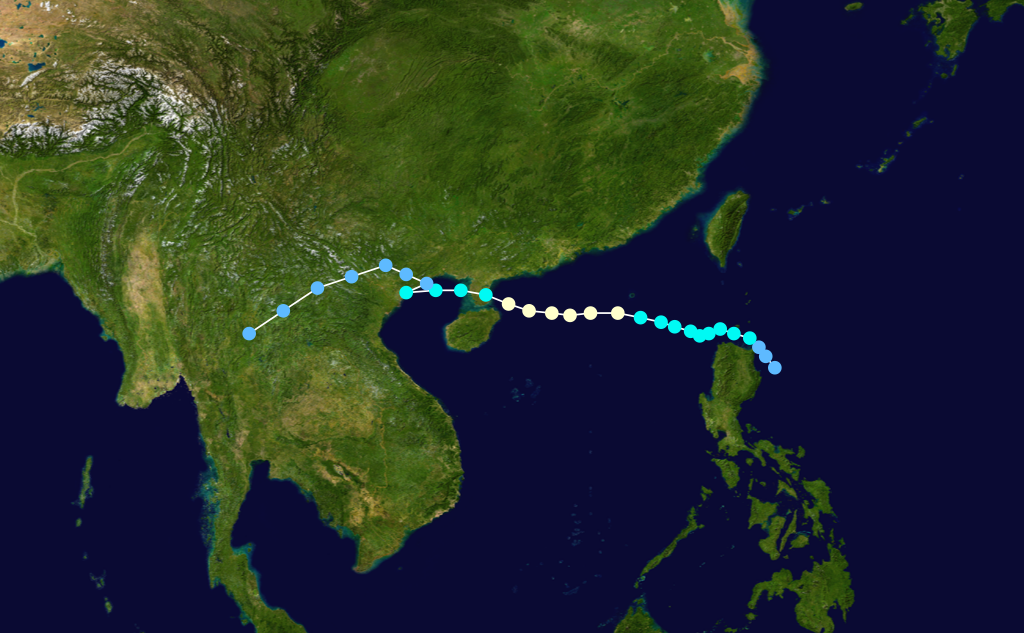
- Duration: August 30 – September 6
- Peak intensity: 140 km/h (85 mph) (1-min); 975 hPa (mbar)

=== Typhoon Marge (Ibiang) ===
- Typhoon (JMA)
- Category 1-equivalent typhoon (SSHWS)
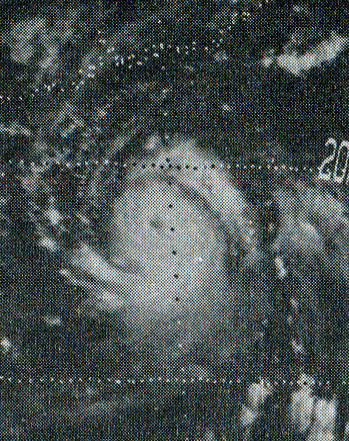
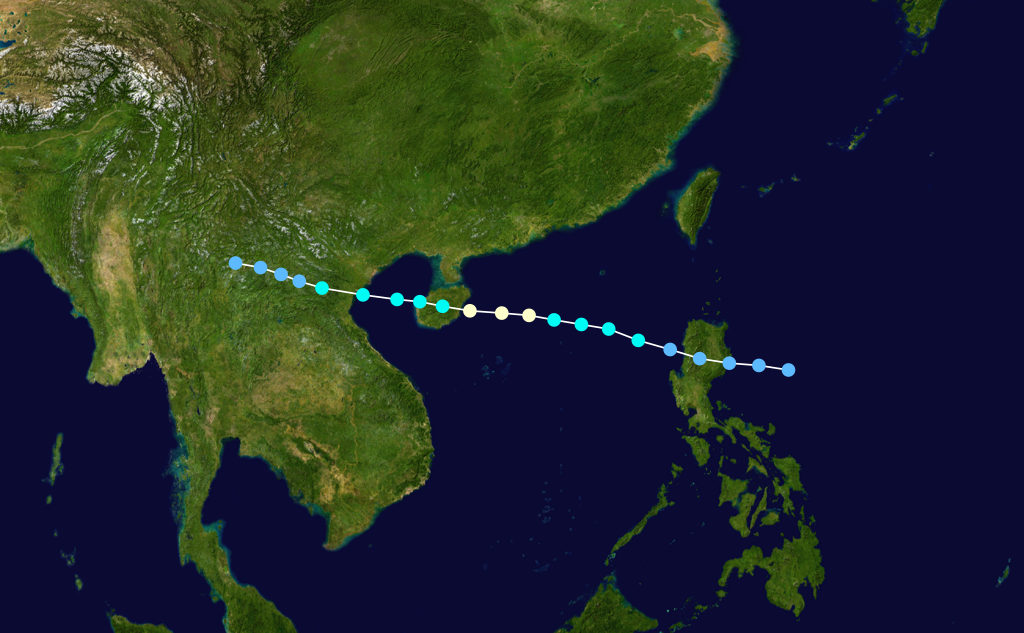
- Duration: September 10 – September 15
- Peak intensity: 150 km/h (90 mph) (1-min); ≤960 hPa (mbar)

Hainan, Qionghai Jiaji town recorded a minimum central pressure of 937.8 hPa when Marge made landfall. Marge killed 903 people in Hainan. Marge made its final landfall in Tam Diep Mountains (border of Ninh Binh and Thanh Hoa provinces) Vietnam in late September 14, 1973; brought heavay rainfall and flooding in North Vietnam.

=== Typhoon Nora (Luming) ===
- Typhoon (JMA)
- Category 5-equivalent super typhoon (SSHWS)
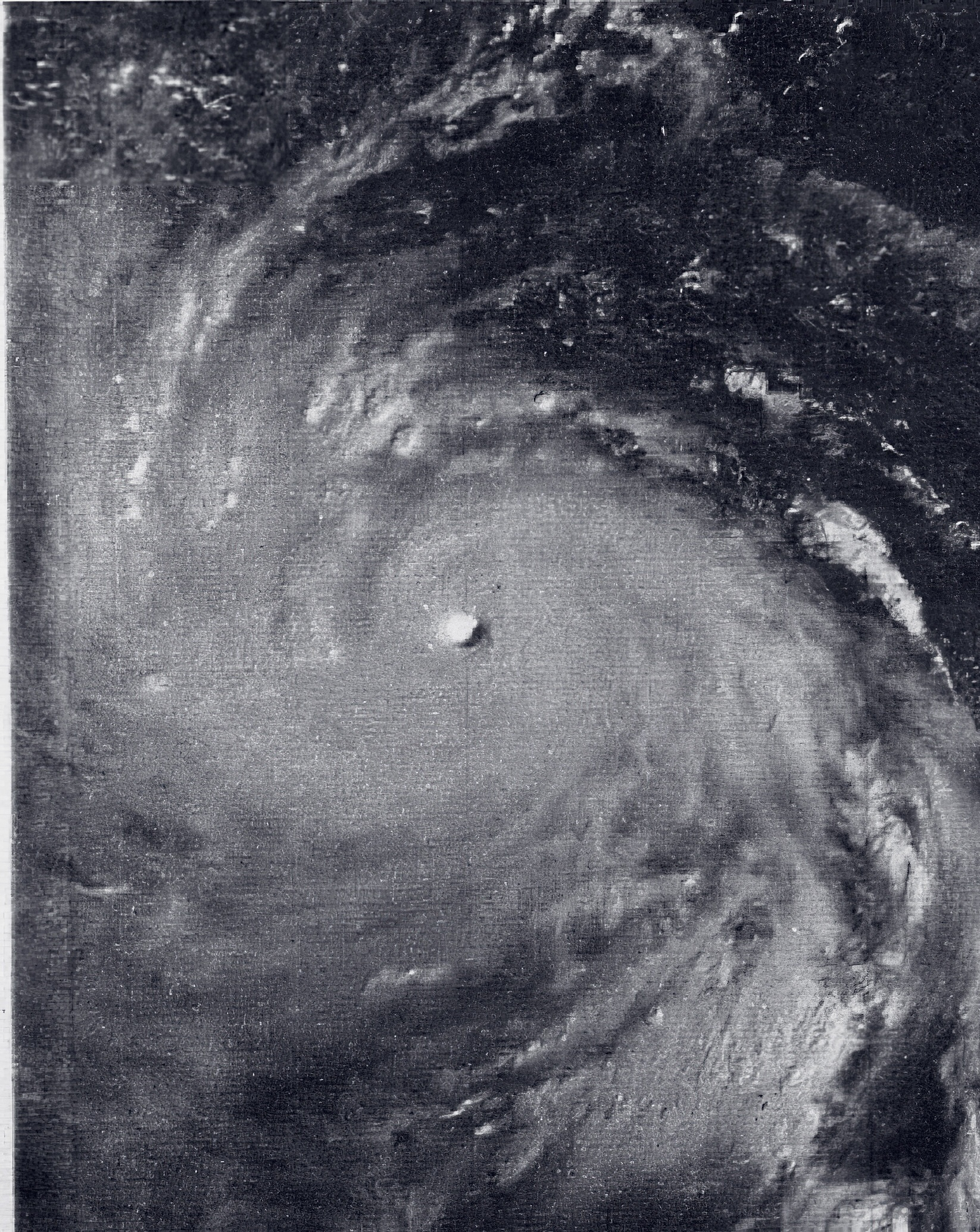
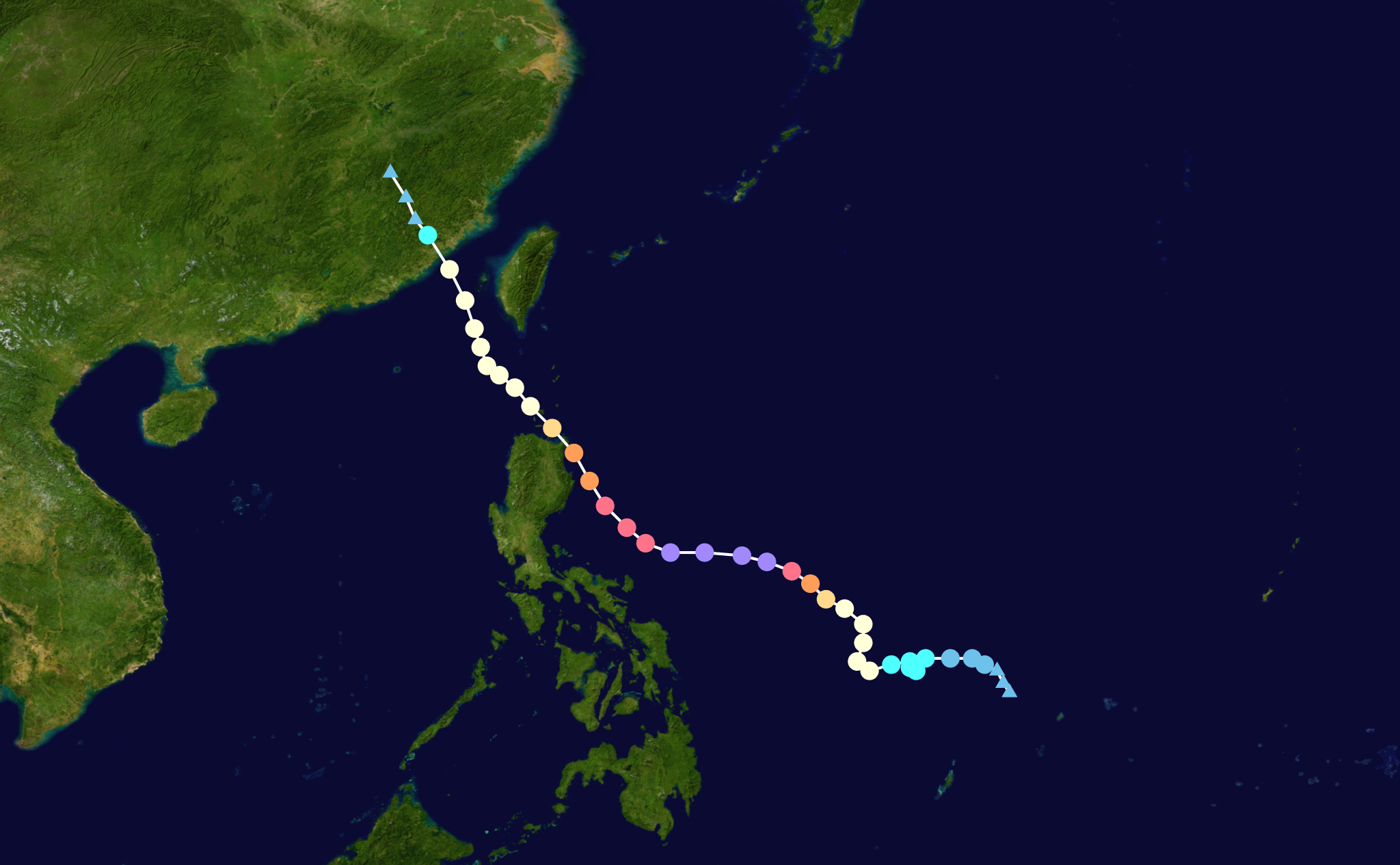
- Duration: October 1 – October 10
- Peak intensity: 295 km/h (185 mph) (1-min); 875 hPa (mbar)

The monsoon trough spawned a tropical depression east of the Philippines on October 1. Under weak steering currents, it meandered westward, where favorable conditions allowed for it to strengthen, first to a tropical storm on the 2nd, then to a typhoon on the 3rd. Nora continued to the northwest, and explosively deepened on the 5th and 6th to a 185 mph super typhoon. At the time, it had a minimum central pressure of 875 millibars, the lowest pressure on record at the time and currently tied for 9th. The typhoon weakened as it headed to the northwest, and struck northeastern Luzon on the 7th as a 115 mph typhoon. Nora continued to the northwest, weakening to a minimal typhoon as it hit southeast China on the 10th. The typhoon caused 18 fatalities, with over $2 million in damage.

=== Typhoon Opal ===
- Typhoon (JMA)
- Category 1-equivalent typhoon (SSHWS)
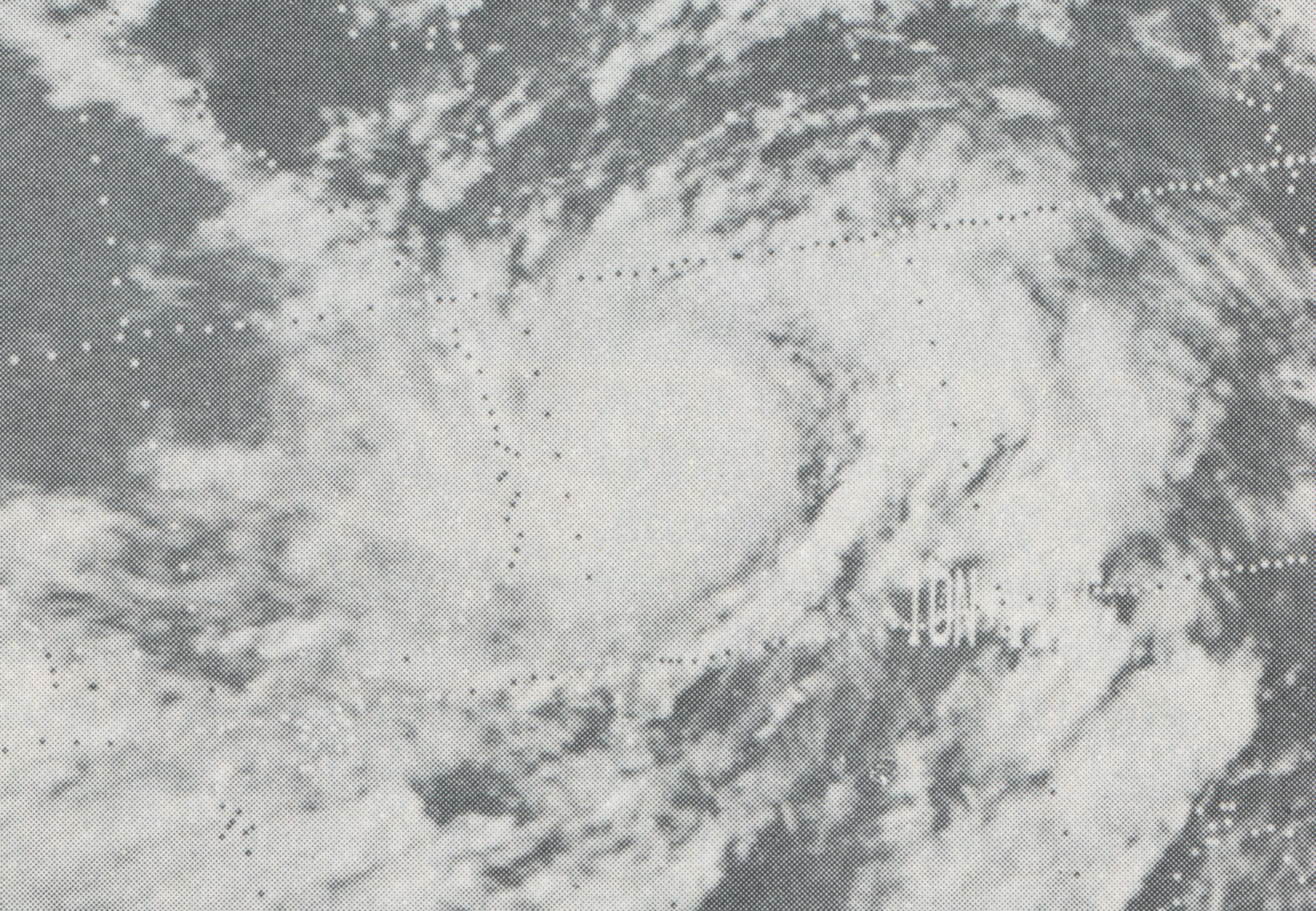
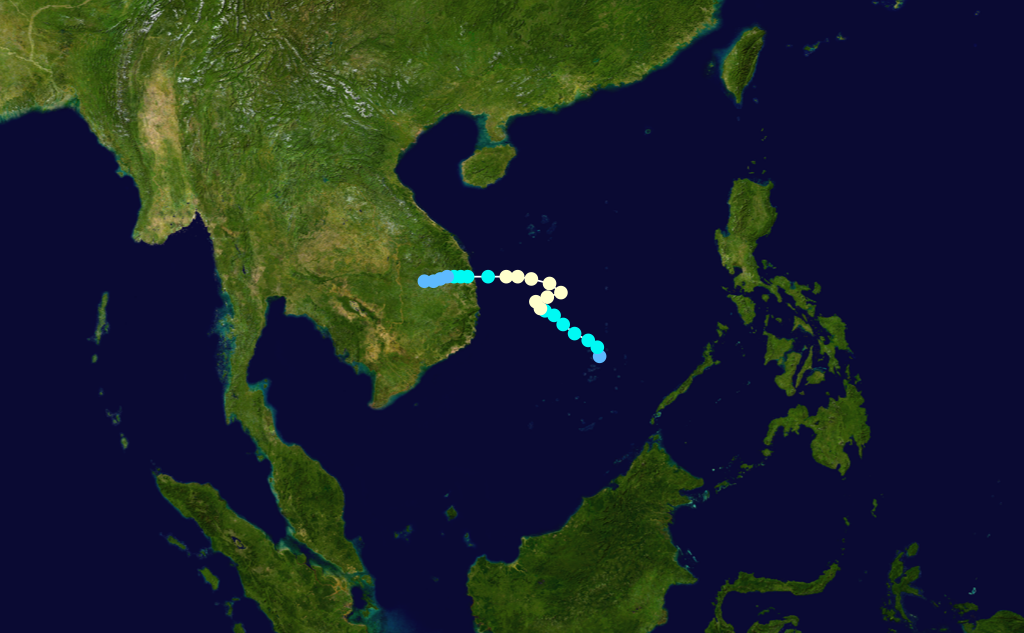
- Duration: October 3 – October 8
- Peak intensity: 140 km/h (85 mph) (1-min); 970 hPa (mbar)

=== Typhoon Patsy (Miling) ===
- Typhoon (JMA)
- Category 5-equivalent super typhoon (SSHWS)
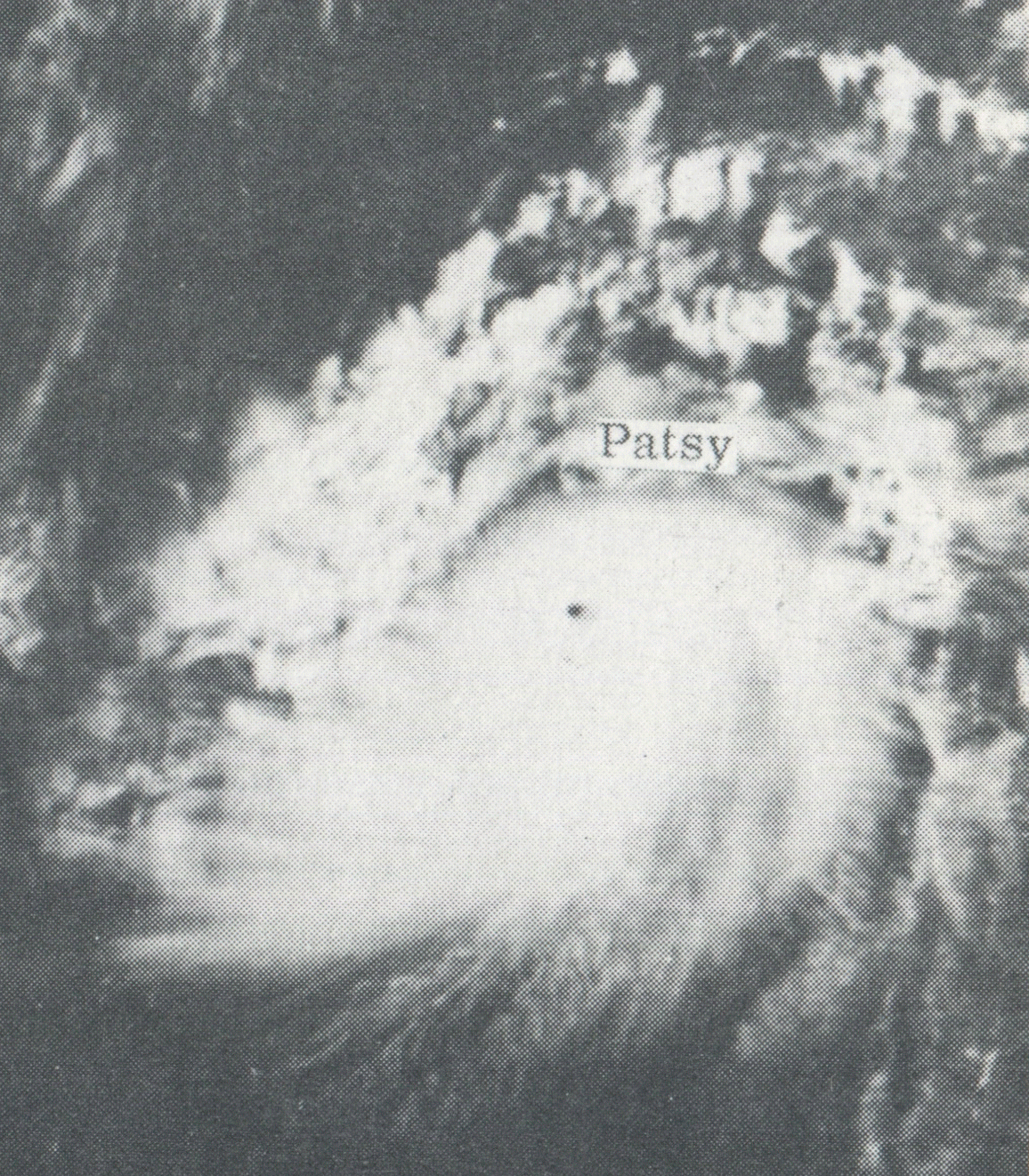
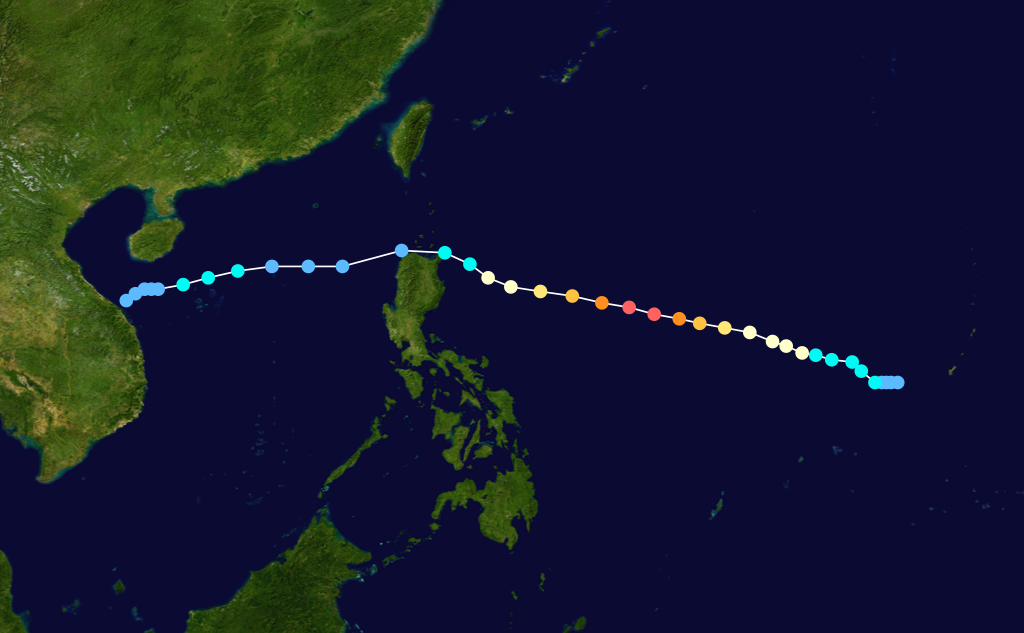
- Duration: October 5 – October 15
- Peak intensity: 260 km/h (160 mph) (1-min); 895 hPa (mbar)

A tropical depression formed and continued to intensify to a category 5 and later after entering the PAR line it starts rapidly weakening until it made landfall in Northern Luzon as a tropical storm and it sped as a tropical depression until it dissipated near Vietnam it was the second super typhoon after just Super typhoon Nora that struck northern Luzon.

=== Typhoon Ruth (Narsing) ===
- Typhoon (JMA)
- Category 2-equivalent typhoon (SSHWS)
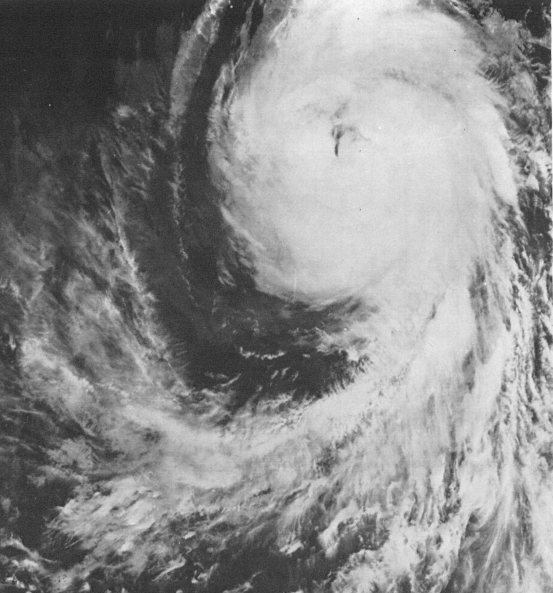
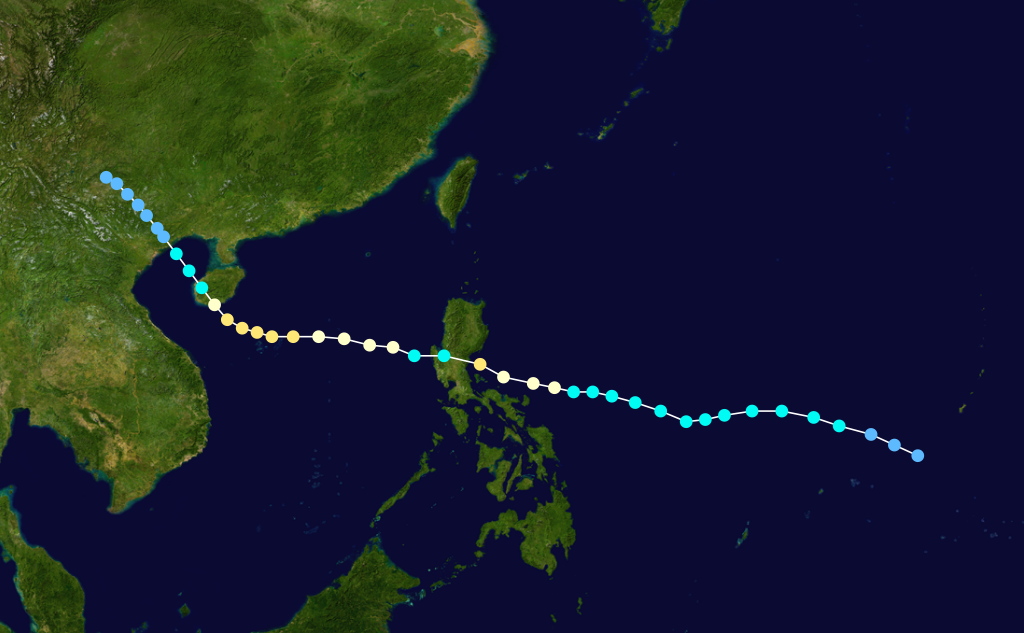
- Duration: October 11 – October 19
- Peak intensity: 165 km/h (105 mph) (1-min); 960 hPa (mbar)

27 people were killed when Typhoon Ruth crossed Luzon on October 15 and caused $5 million in damage. Ruth continued to the northwest, and hit Hainan Island and Quang Ninh, Vietnam on the 19th, respectively.

=== Severe Tropical Storm Sarah ===
- Severe tropical storm (JMA)
- Tropical storm (SSHWS)
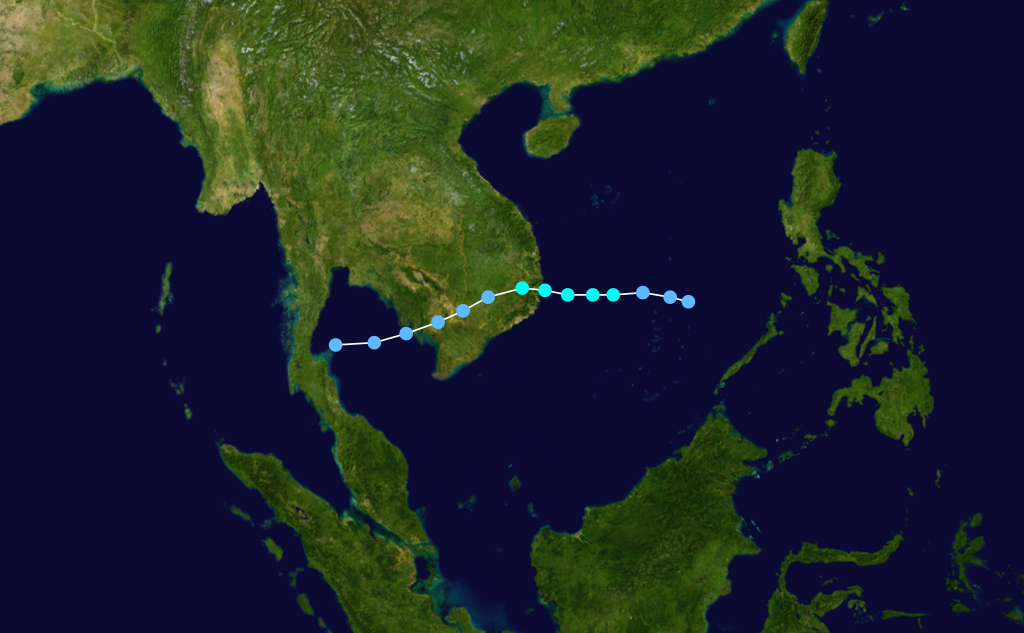
- Duration: November 9 – November 12
- Peak intensity: 100 km/h (65 mph) (1-min); 985 hPa (mbar)

On November 12 this system emerged in the Bay of Bengal and became Tropical Storm Thirteen (13B)

=== Severe Tropical Storm Thelma ===
- Severe tropical storm (JMA)
- Tropical storm (SSHWS)
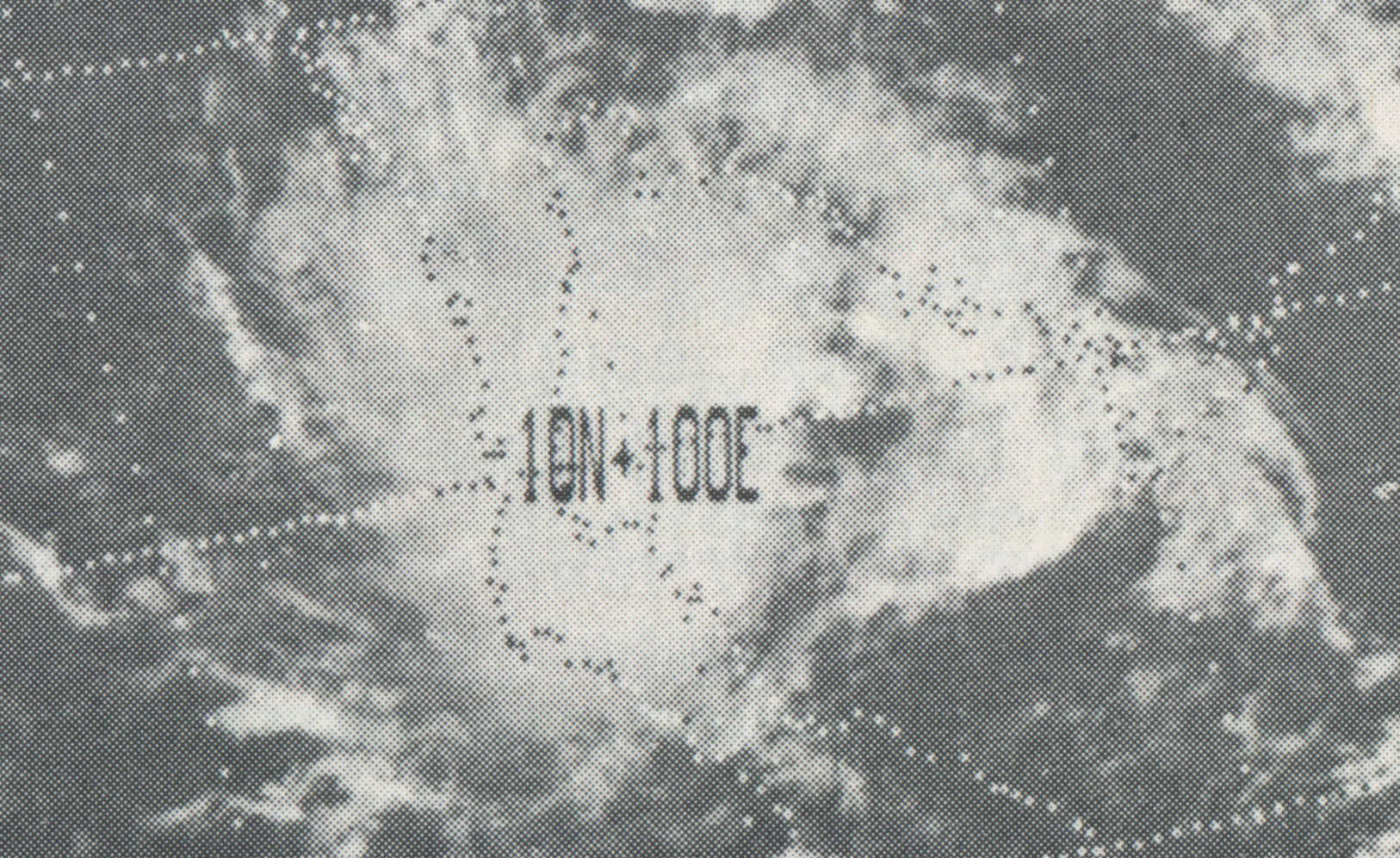
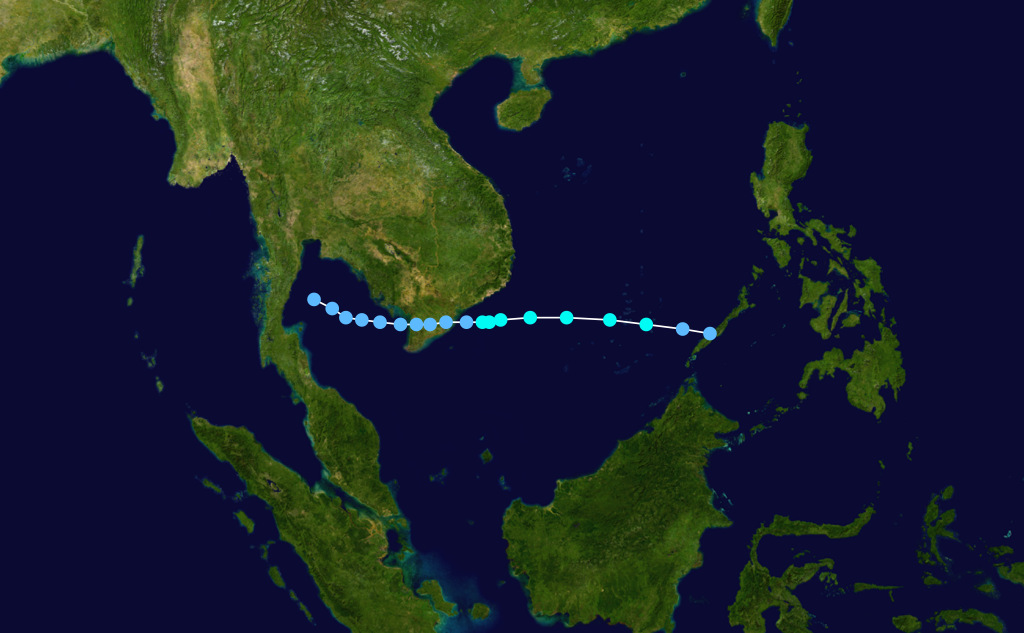
- Duration: November 13 – November 18
- Peak intensity: 100 km/h (65 mph) (1-min); 990 hPa (mbar)

=== Severe Tropical Storm Vera (Openg) ===
- Severe tropical storm (JMA)
- Tropical storm (SSHWS)
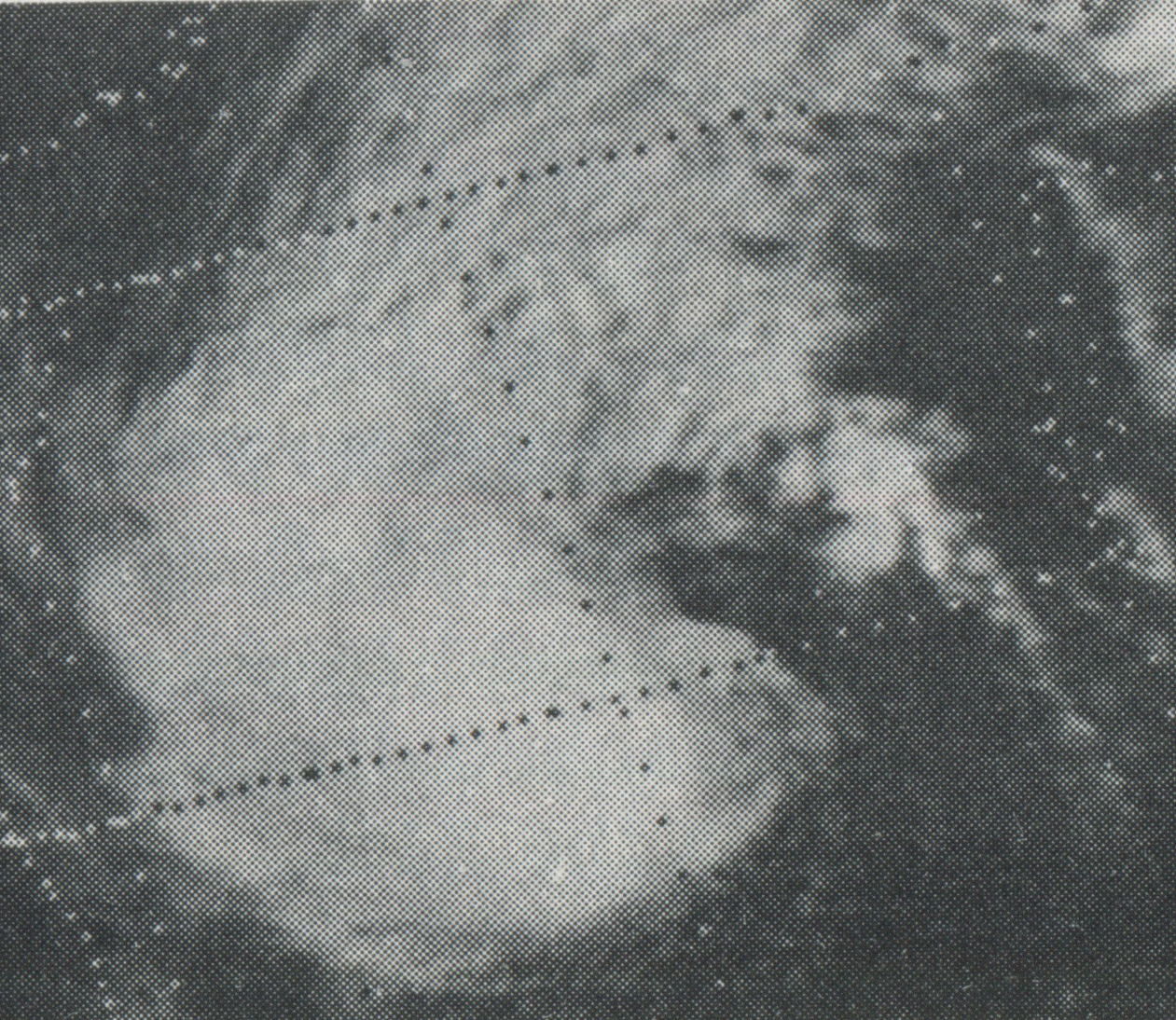
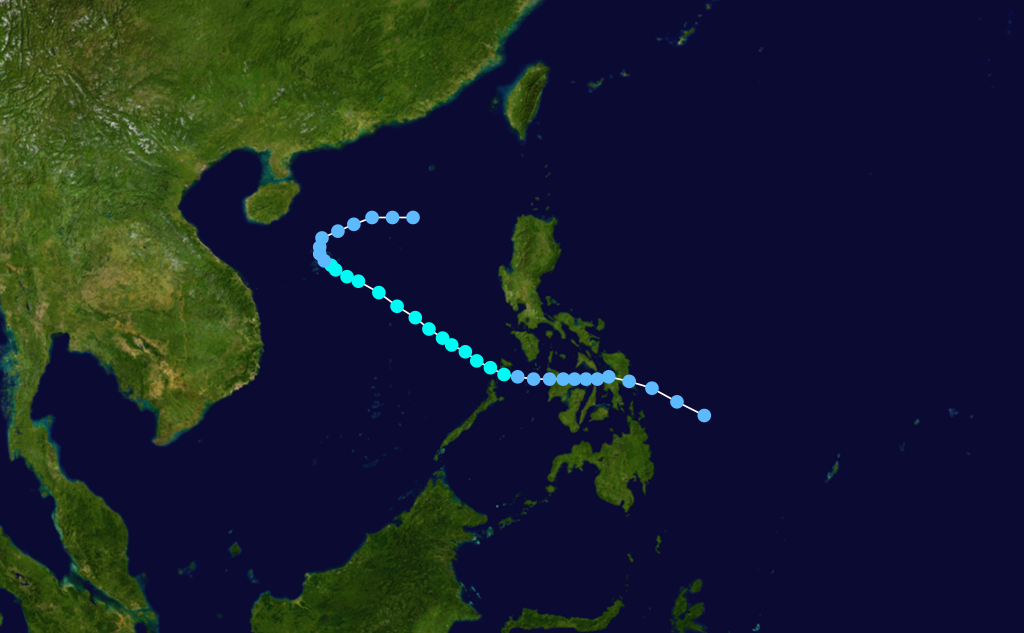
- Duration: November 18 – November 26
- Peak intensity: 95 km/h (60 mph) (1-min); 990 hPa (mbar)

One of the strongest tropical cyclones to hit Visayas when it entered on November 20, although the system didn't reach typhoon status. Tropical Storm Openg affected around 3.4 million people.

== Storm names ==
Western North Pacific tropical cyclones were named by the Joint Typhoon Warning Center. The first storm of 1973 was named Wilda and the final one was named Vera.

- Agnes
- Bess
- Carmen
- Della
- Elaine
- Faye
- Gloria
- Hester
- Irma
- Judy
- Kit
- Lola
- Mamie
- Nina
- Ora
- Phyllis
- Rita
- Susan
- Tess
- Viola
- Winnie
- Alice
- Betty
- Cora
- Doris
- Elsie
- Flossie
- Grace
- Helen
- Ida
- June
- Kathy
- Lorna
- Marie
- Nancy
- Olga
- Pamela
- Ruby
- Sally
- Therese
- Violet
- Wilda 1W
- Anita 2W
- Billie 4W
- Clara 3W
- Dot 5W
- Ellen 6W
- Fran 7W
- Georgia 8W
- Hope 9W
- Iris 10W
- Joan 12W
- Kate 13W
- Louise 15W
- Marge 16W
- Nora 17W
- Opal 18W
- Patsy 19W
- Ruth 20W
- Sarah 21W
- Thelma 22W
- Vera 23W
- Wanda
- Amy
- Babe
- Carla
- Dinah
- Emma
- Freda
- Gilda
- Harriet
- Ivy
- Jean
- Kim
- Lucy
- Mary
- Nadine
- Olive
- Polly
- Rose
- Shirley
- Trix
- Virginia
- Wendy

=== Philippines ===
Atring	Bining	Kuring	Daling	Elang
Goring	Huling	Ibiang	Luming	Miling
Narsing	Openg	Pining (unused)	Rubing (unused)	Saling (unused)
Tasing (unused)	Unding (unused)	Walding (unused)	Yeyeng (unused)	
Auxiliary list
				Anding (unused)
Binang (unused)	Kadiang (unused)	Dinang (unused)	Epang (unused)	Gundang (unused)

The Philippine Atmospheric, Geophysical and Astronomical Services Administration uses its own naming scheme for tropical cyclones in their area of responsibility. PAGASA assigns names to tropical depressions that form within their area of responsibility and any tropical cyclone that might move into their area of responsibility. Should the list of names for a given year prove to be insufficient, names are taken from an auxiliary list, the first 10 of which are published each year before the season starts. This is the same list used for the 1969 season. PAGASA uses its own naming scheme that starts in the Filipino alphabet, with names of Filipino female names ending with "ng" (A, B, K, D, etc.).

== Season effects ==
This table will list all the storms that developed in the northwestern Pacific Ocean west of the International Date Line and north of the equator during 1973. It will include their intensity, duration, name, areas affected, deaths, missing persons (in parentheses), and damage totals. Classification and intensity values will be based on estimations conducted by the JMA, however due to lack of information around this time sustained winds were recorded by the JTWC. All damage figures will be in 1973 USD. Damages and deaths from a storm will include when the storm was a precursor wave or an extratropical low.

Name	Dates	Peak intensity			Areas affected	Damage (USD)	Deaths	Ref(s).
Name	Dates	Category	Wind speed	Pressure	Areas affected	Damage (USD)	Deaths	Ref(s).
TD	May 12	Tropical depression	Not specified	1008 hPa (29.77 inHg)	South China	None	None	
Wilda (Atring)	June 28 – July 6	Severe tropical storm	110 km/h (70 mph)	980 hPa (28.94 inHg)	Philippines, China	Unknown	Unknown	
Anita	July 4 – 10	Typhoon	130 km/h (80 mph)	980 hPa (28.94 inHg)	Vietnam, Thailand	Unknown	Unknown	
Billie (Bining)	July 11 – 19	Typhoon	240 km/h (150 mph)	915 hPa (27.02 inHg)	Philippines, Ryukyu Islands, China	Unknown	Unknown	
Dot	July 11 – 21	Typhoon	155 km/h (100 mph)	975 hPa (28.79 inHg)	China, Ryukyu Islands, Korean Peninsula	Unknown	1	
Clara	July 12 – 15	Severe tropical storm	100 km/h (65 mph)	985 hPa (29.09 inHg)	None	None	None	
Ellen	July 16 – 29	Typhoon	195 km/h (120 mph)	940 hPa (27.76 inHg)	Japan	None	None	
TD	July 16	Tropical depression	Not specified	1010 hPa (29.83 inHg)	Mariana Islands	None	None	
Fran (Kuring)	July 23 – 30	Tropical storm	75 km/h (45 mph)	1000 hPa (29.53 inHg)	Philippines	None	None	
Georgia	August 5 – 15	Typhoon	130 km/h (80 mph)	980 hPa (28.94 inHg)	China	Unknown	Unknown	
TD	August 5 – 6	Tropical depression	Not specified	1008 hPa (29.77 inHg)	Philippines	None	None	
Iris (Daling)	August 6 – 21	Typhoon	155 km/h (100 mph)	970 hPa (28.64 inHg)	Ryukyu Islands, Korean Peninsula	Unknown	Unknown	
Hope	August 8 – 13	Tropical storm	85 km/h (50 mph)	1000 hPa (29.53 inHg)	None	None	None	
11W	August 10 – 18	Tropical depression	55 km/h (35 mph)	1008 hPa (29.77 inHg)	None	None	None	
TD	August 16 – 18	Tropical depression	Not specified	1000 hPa (29.53 inHg)	Philippines	None	None	
Joan (Elang)	August 18 – 22	Tropical storm	85 km/h (50 mph)	990 hPa (29.23 inHg)	Philippines, Taiwan, China	None	None	
TD	August 20	Tropical depression	Not specified	996 hPa (29.41 inHg)	Taiwan	None	None	
Kate (Goring)	August 20 – 26	Severe tropical storm	110 km/h (70 mph)	975 hPa (28.79 inHg)	Philippines, South China, Vietnam	Unknown	Unknown	
TD	August 24 – 28	Tropical depression	Not specified	1002 hPa (29.59 inHg)	Taiwan, Ryukyu Islands, China	None	None	
14W	August 28 – September 3	Tropical depression	55 km/h (35 mph)	1002 hPa (29.59 inHg)	South China, Vietnam	None	None	
Louise (Huling)	August 30 – September 6	Typhoon	140 km/h (85 mph)	975 hPa (28.79 inHg)	Philippines, South China	Unknown	Unknown	
TD	September 4	Tropical depression	Not specified	1018 hPa (30.07 inHg)	None	None	None	
Marge (Ibiang)	September 10 – 15	Typhoon	150 km/h (90 mph)	965 hPa (28.50 inHg)	Philippines, South China	Unknown	903	
TD	September 20 – 21	Tropical depression	Not specified	1008 hPa (29.77 inHg)	None	None	None	
Nora (Luming)	October 1 – 10	Typhoon	295 km/h (185 mph)	875 hPa (25.84 inHg)	Philippines, South China	$2 million	40	
Opal	October 3 – 8	Typhoon	140 km/h (85 mph)	970 hPa (28.64 inHg)	Vietnam, Cambodia, Laos	Unknown	Unknown	
Patsy (Miling)	October 5 – 15	Typhoon	260 km/h (160 mph)	895 hPa (26.43 inHg)	Philippines, Vietnam	Unknown	Unknown	
TD	October 10 – 12	Tropical depression	Not specified	1000 hPa (29.53 inHg)	None	None	None	
Ruth (Narsing)	October 11 – 19	Typhoon	165 km/h (105 mph)	960 hPa (28.35 inHg)	Caroline Islands, Philippines, South China	$5 million	27	
TD	October 13 – 15	Tropical depression	Not specified	1000 hPa (29.53 inHg)	Vietnam	None	None	
TD	October 17 – 18	Tropical depression	Not specified	1000 hPa (29.53 inHg)	Mariana Islands	None	None	
TD	October 17 – 20	Tropical depression	Not specified	1000 hPa (29.53 inHg)	None	None	None	
TD	October 27 – November 1	Tropical depression	Not specified	1000 hPa (29.53 inHg)	Palau	None	None	
TD	October 31 – November 3	Tropical depression	Not specified	1006 hPa (29.71 inHg)	None	None	None	
Sarah	November 9 – 12	Severe tropical storm	100 km/h (65 mph)	985 hPa (29.09 inHg)	Vietnam, Cambodia, Thailand	Unknown	Unknown	
Thelma	November 13 – 18	Severe tropical storm	100 km/h (65 mph)	990 hPa (29.23 inHg)	Philippines, Vietnam, Thailand	Unknown	Unknown	
Vera (Openg)	November 18 – 26	Severe tropical storm	95 km/h (60 mph)	990 hPa (29.23 inHg)	Philippines	Unknown	Unknown	
TD	December 25 – 26	Tropical depression	Not specified	1006 hPa (29.71 inHg)	Malaysia	None	None	
TD	December 26 – 27	Tropical depression	Not specified	1000 hPa (29.53 inHg)	Philippines	None	None	
Season aggregates
39 systems	May 12 – December 27, 1973		295 km/h (185 mph)	875 hPa (25.84 inHg)		>$7 million	>1,011	

== See also ==
- 1973 Pacific hurricane season
- 1973 Atlantic hurricane season
- 1973 North Indian Ocean cyclone season
- Australian cyclone seasons: 1972–73, 1973–74
- South Pacific cyclone seasons: 1972–73, 1973–74
- South-West Indian Ocean cyclone seasons: 1972–73, 1973–74
