= Typhoon Nora (1973) =

Pacific typhoon in 1973

Typhoon Nora (Luming)
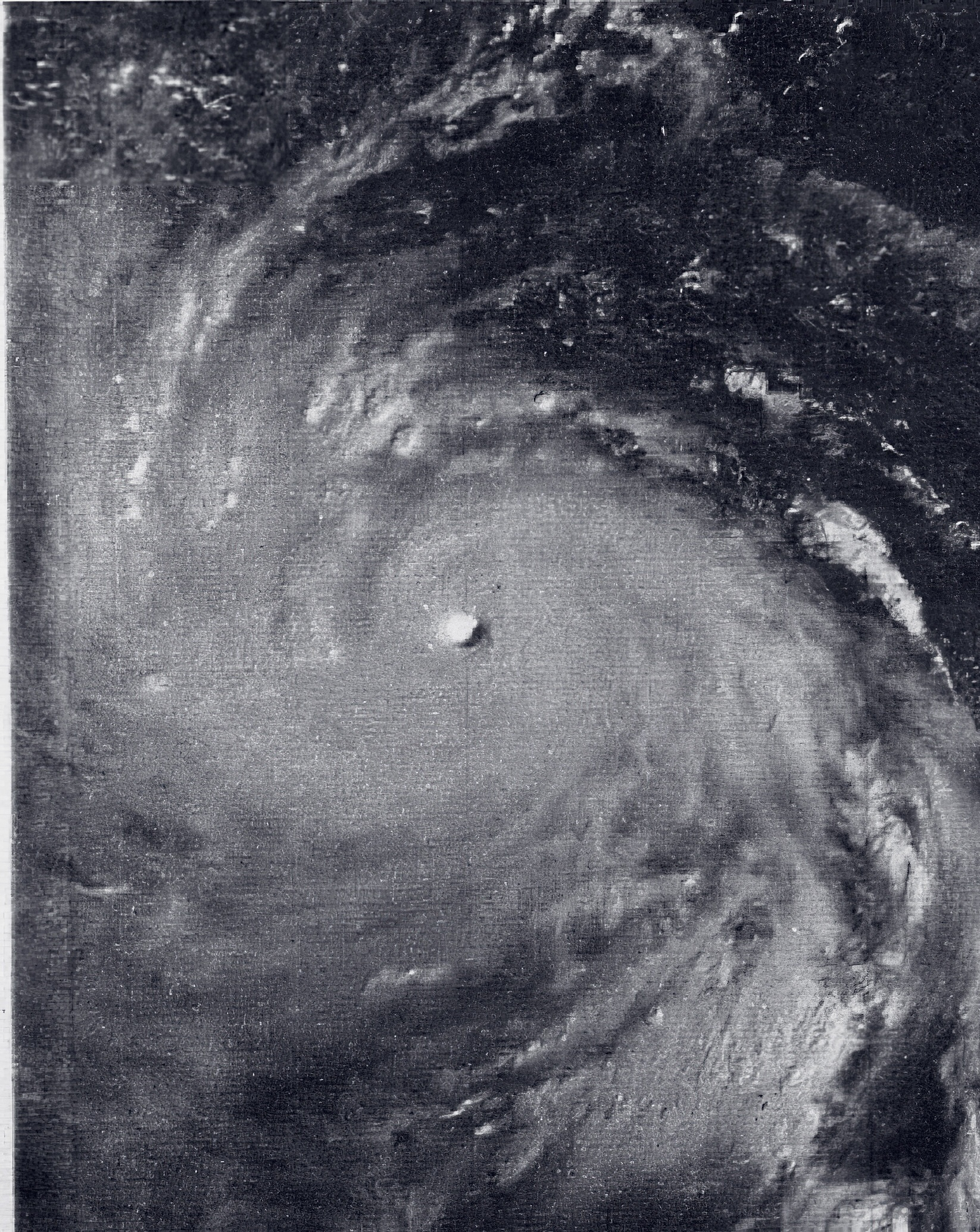
- Nora nearing peak intensity east of the Philippines on October 5

Meteorological history
- Formed: October 2, 1973
- Remnant low: October 10, 1973
- Dissipated: October 11, 1973

Violent typhoon
- 10-minute sustained (JMA)
- Lowest pressure: 875 hPa (mbar); 25.84 inHg (Tied for third-lowest worldwide)

Category 5-equivalent super typhoon
- 1-minute sustained (SSHWS/JTWC)
- Highest winds: 295 km/h (185 mph)
- Lowest pressure: 875 hPa (mbar); 25.84 inHg (Tied for third-lowest worldwide)

Overall effects
- Fatalities: 40 total
- Missing: 28
- Damage: $2 million (1973 USD)
- Areas affected: Philippines, Taiwan, Eastern China, Hong Kong
- IBTrACS
- Part of the 1973 Pacific typhoon season

Typhoon Nora, known in the Philippines as Super Typhoon Luming, is tied for the third-most intense tropical cyclone on record. Originating from an area of low pressure over the western Pacific, Nora was first identified as a tropical depression on October 2, 1973. Tracking generally westward, the system gradually intensified, attaining typhoon status the following evening. After turning northwestward, the typhoon underwent a period of rapid intensification, during which its central pressure decreased by 77 mb (hPa; 2.27 inHg) in 24 hours. At the end of this phase, Nora peaked with winds of 295 km/h (185 mph) and a pressure of 875 mb (hPa; 25.84 inHg), making it the most-intense tropical cyclone on record (alongside Typhoon Ida in 1958) at the time; however, this pressure has since been tied with Typhoon June, and surpassed by Typhoon Tip and Hurricane Patricia. The typhoon subsequently weakened and turned northwestward as it approached the Philippines. After brushing Luzon on October 7, the system passed south of Taiwan and ultimately made landfall in China on October 10. Once onshore, Nora quickly weakened and dissipated the following day.

The Philippines and Taiwan sustained the most extensive losses from Typhoon Nora, with 36 people losing their lives collectively. In the former, more than 1 million residents were left homeless as high winds and flooding wrecked homes. Damage in the country reached US$2 million (equivalent to $14.2 million in 2024). In Taiwan, more than 1,000 homes were destroyed and 8,000 people were left homeless. The typhoon was also responsible for several maritime incidents that killed at least four people. In total, 40 people died as a result of Nora. It was also the first of three tropical cyclones to impact the Philippines in a short period, with typhoons Patsy and Ruth following several days later.

== Meteorological history ==
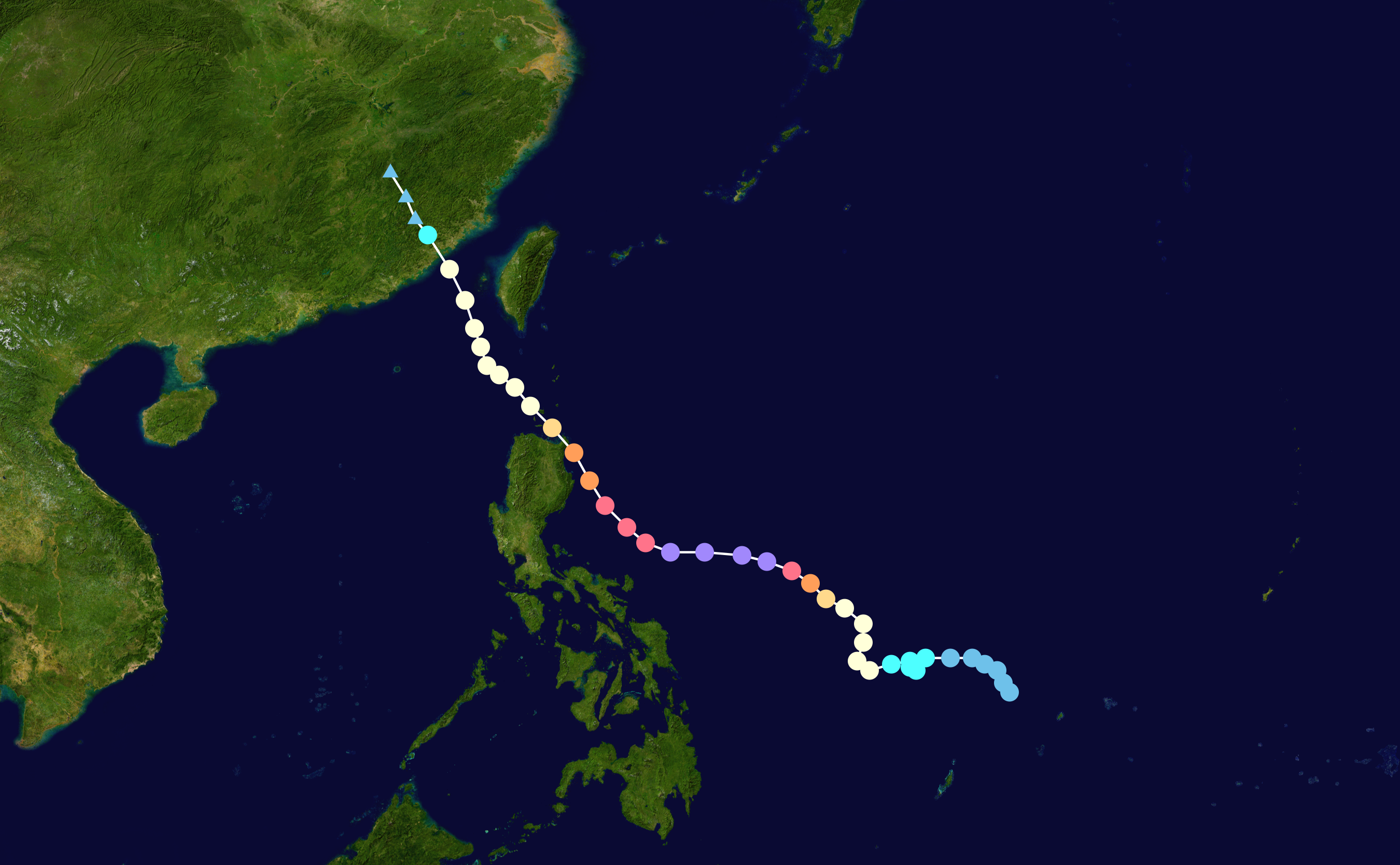
Map plotting the storm's track and intensity, according to the Saffir–Simpson scale Map key Saffir–Simpson scale Tropical depression (≤38 mph, ≤62 km/h) Tropical storm (39–73 mph, 63–118 km/h) Category 1 (74–95 mph, 119–153 km/h) Category 2 (96–110 mph, 154–177 km/h) Category 3 (111–129 mph, 178–208 km/h) Category 4 (130–156 mph, 209–251 km/h) Category 5 (≥157 mph, ≥252 km/h) Unknown Storm type Tropical cyclone Subtropical cyclone Extratropical cyclone, remnant low, tropical disturbance, or monsoon depression

On September 30, a weak surface low developed within the monsoon trough about 195 km (120 mi) south of Yap. Drifting northwestward, the system gradually organized into a tropical depression by October 2. Later that day, aircraft reconnaissance revealed the system to have intensified into a tropical storm, at which time it was assigned the name Nora. The system's movement soon became slow and erratic, with Nora executing a counter-clockwise loop on October 3. After completing the loop, it attained typhoon status and acquired a temporary northward trajectory. Due to the cyclone's proximity to the Philippines, the Philippine Atmospheric, Geophysical and Astronomical Services Administration also monitored the storm and assigned it with the local name Luming. Late on October 4, Nora began to undergo a period of rapid intensification. Several aircraft reconnaissance missions were flown by the U.S. Air Force 54th Weather Reconnaissance Squadron into the storm between October 5 and 6, documenting the typhoon's dramatic strengthening.

Most intense tropical cyclones
	Cyclone	Season	Basin	Pressure	
	Cyclone	Season	Basin	hPa	inHg
1	Tip	1979	W. Pacific	870	25.7
2	Patricia	2015	E. Pacific	872	25.7
3	June	1975	W. Pacific	875	25.8
3	Nora	1973	W. Pacific	875	25.8
5	Forrest	1983	W. Pacific	876	25.9
6	Ida	1958	W. Pacific	877	25.9
7	Rita	1978	W. Pacific	878	26.0
8	Kit	1966	W. Pacific	880	26.0
8	Vanessa	1984	W. Pacific	880	26.0
10	Nancy	1961	W. Pacific	882	26.4
10	Wilma	2005	Atlantic	882	26.4
Source: JMA Typhoon Best Track Analysis. National Hurricane Center Tropical Cyclone Reports.

By the evening of October 5, Nora had attained winds in excess of 260 km/h (160 mph), ranking it as a Category 5-equivalent super typhoon on the Saffir–Simpson hurricane scale. A recon mission into the storm at this time revealed concentric eyewalls, measured at 14 km (9 mi) and 32 km (20 mi). Initially, the aircraft was unable to penetrate into the core of the eye due to severe turbulence; however, they were successful after a second attempt. Once inside the eye, they discovered an almost cloud-free center with "an amphitheater or bowl-like appearance." Stratocumulus clouds were suppressed to an unusually low altitude of 1.2 km (0.75 mi). The core of Nora was exceptionally warm, with temperatures reaching a near-record 30 °C (86 °F) at the 700 mb level. At 0020 UTC on October 6, a dropsonde released by the reconnaissance team recorded a surface pressure of 877 mb (hPa; 25.91 inHg) just inside the eyewall of the typhoon. At this time, maximum winds were estimated to have peaked at 295 km/h (185 mph). This intensity ranked Nora as the most-intense tropical cyclone on record in the world, alongside Typhoon Ida in 1958. However, in post-storm analysis, it was noted that since the dropsonde did not record a pressure at the storm's center, Nora was likely slightly stronger than indicated. Since then, Nora's intensity has been surpassed by 2 other storms: Typhoon Tip in 1979, and Hurricane Patricia in 2015.

Despite the storm's extreme intensity, it quickly began to weaken as it approached the Philippines on October 6. Within ten hours, the pressure rose to 894 mb (hPa; 26.40 inHg) and later dropped below Category 5 status. That morning, Nora turned more northwesterly in response to a weakening in a subtropical ridge and an approaching shortwave trough over China. Steady weakening continued over the following days, with the storm brushing the northeastern tip of Luzon, Philippines, with winds of 175–185 km/h (110–115 mph) on October 7. Nora's intensity leveled out around 130 km/h (80 mph) on October 8 as it tracked between the Philippines and Taiwan. After passing within 95 km (60 mi) of Taiwan, Nora turned more northerly before making landfall near Xiamen, Fujian as a minimal typhoon early on October 10. Once onshore, the storm rapidly degenerated into an area of low pressure before dissipating the following day.

== Preparations and impact ==
=== Philippines ===
==== Luzon ====
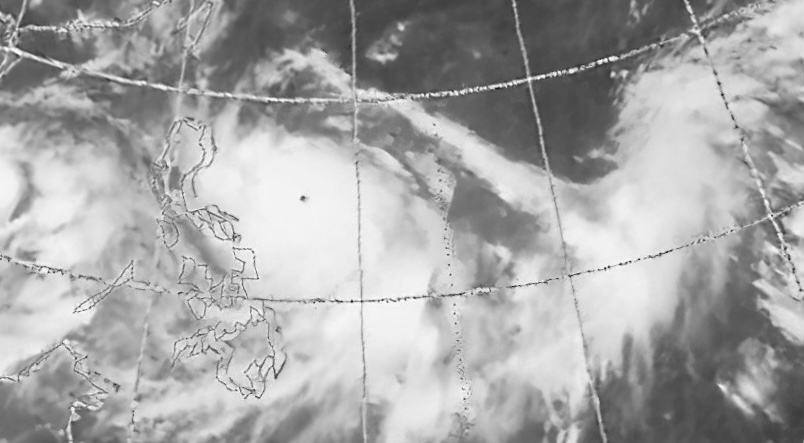
Typhoon Nora near peak intensity.

Prior to the typhoon's arrival in the Philippines, all domestic flights in and out of Manila were cancelled; however, international travel was unaffected. The United States Air Force also moved its planes from Clark Air Base to other bases in Asia. Additionally, all schools in Manila were closed. Brushing the coast of Luzon in the Philippines as a Category 3-equivalent typhoon, Nora caused considerable damage in the region. Gale-force winds were measured across much of western Luzon, with a peak reading of 126 km/h (78 mph) at Manila port. These winds caused scattered power and communication losses throughout the Peninsula. The city of Baguio (population 100,000) lost power for approximately six hours. Crop losses were extensive, with the storm striking close to harvest time. Heavy rains from the storm, peaking at 338 mm (13.3 in) in Baguio, triggered significant flooding and caused a breach in the Arnedo Dike in Apalit, Pampanga. Eight towns along a 45 km (30 mi) stretch downstream were flooded; however, roads remained passable. Flooding in Manila also prompted the evacuation of 400 residents. In Caloocan, a child died after being electrocuted by downed wires. Across the Philippines, 24 people were killed and over 1 million were left homeless. Damage to crops and property reached US$2 million (equivalent to $14.2 million in 2024).

=== South China Sea ===
While passing south of Taiwan, rough seas spawned by the typhoon were responsible for several maritime incidents over the Taiwan Strait and South China Sea. The Philippine Freighter Asian Mariner, though all 38 crewmen were rescued. The Greek freighter Baltic Klif capsized about 150 km (90 mi) southwest of the Penghu Islands, with three crewmen confirmed dead and several others missing and presumed dead. Additionally, the Taiwanese fishing vessel Jai Tai NR3 became stranded amid 9.1 m (30 ft) seas, with its bow split open. One of the crew perished; however, the frigate USS Worden was able to rescue seven fishermen despite the dangerous seas. As the storm neared landfall in China, two ships became stranded over the South China Sea and sent out distress signals.

=== Taiwan and China ===
Passing within 95 km (60 mi) of Taiwan, the storm brought gale-force winds and torrential rain to the island. A peak gust of 126 km/h (78 mph) was measured in Tungchi, Penghu Islands. The most significant impacts came from the rains, which amounted to 523 mm (20.6 in) in Sinkong over a 20‑hour span. Widespread flooding and many landslides destroyed at least 1,000 homes, and washed out bridges, roads, and railroads. Twelve people lost their lives and twenty-eight others were reported missing. Additionally, 8,000 people were left homeless. In Hong Kong, the typhoon produced gusty winds, peaking at 95 km/h (60 mph), though no rainfall was recorded. Although Nora struck China as a typhoon, there were no reports of damage received.

== Aftermath ==
Nora was the first of three typhoons to impact the Philippines in the span of a week, with Patsy and Ruth both striking the country on October 12 and 15 respectively. This hampered recovery efforts as a result, particularly with Ruth, as the latter would kill an additional 27 in Luzon.

== See also ==
- 1973 Pacific typhoon season
- List of the most intense tropical cyclones
  - Typhoon Tip
  - Typhoon Ida (1958)
  - Typhoon Goni (2020) - Another extremely powerful typhoon that peaked in the same region as Nora
  - Typhoon Doksuri (2023) - A typhoon that similar track to Nora
