= Typhoon Joan (1959) =

Pacific typhoon in 1959

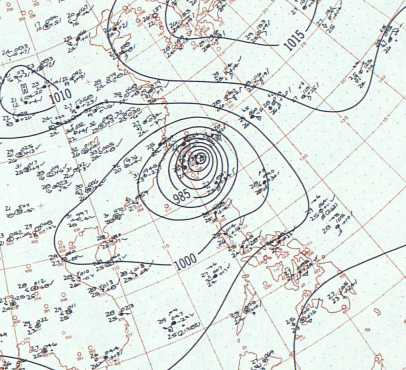
- Surface weather analysis of Typhoon Joan at nearing landfall in Taiwan on August 29

Meteorological history
- Formed: August 25, 1959
- Extratropical: August 31, 1959
- Dissipated: September 2, 1959

Typhoon
- 10-minute sustained (JMA)
- Lowest pressure: 885 hPa (mbar); 26.13 inHg

Category 5-equivalent super typhoon
- 1-minute sustained (SSHWS/JTWC)
- Highest winds: 315 km/h (195 mph)
- Lowest pressure: 891 hPa (mbar); 26.31 inHg

Overall effects
- Fatalities: 41
- Damage: ≥$3 million (1959 USD)
- Areas affected: China, Taiwan, South Korea, Japan
- Part of the 1959 Pacific typhoon season

Typhoon Joan was an intense typhoon that caused minor damages in relative to the strength of the typhoon. Joan was the strongest typhoon of 1959 Pacific typhoon season, and one of the most intense Pacific typhoons on record. Joan formed from a surface center to the northeast of Guam on August 23, in which Japan Meteorological Agency began to track and classify the system as a tropical depression on the next day. A reconnaissance aircraft was sent to investigate the surface center and in 03:25 UTC on August 25 the surface center was classified as a tropical storm by Joint Typhoon Warning Center. The storm rapidly intensified into a typhoon in the same day it was formed. By the next three days as Joan tracks towards Taiwan, Joan explosively intensified to attain peak intensity with the pressure of 885 millibars (26.1 inHg), which is tied with Nina as the most intense Pacific typhoon on the record at the time. Shortly afterwards, Joan attained peak strength as a Category 5 equivalent super typhoon on the Saffir–Simpson hurricane scale with winds of 165 knots (190 mph) before making landfall in Taiwan as a 160 knots (180 mph) typhoon, which was according to JTWC is the strongest landfall in the recorded history at the time. After making landfall, Joan weakened into a 110 knots (130 mph) typhoon before making landfall on Fujian, China as a Category 2 equivalent typhoon on the Saffir–Simpson hurricane scale with winds of 95 knots (109 mph). Once onshore, Joan did not degenerate quickly as Joan remained as a tropical cyclone for about one day before transitioning into a extratropical cyclone in 18:00 UTC of August 31. Extratropical remnants of Joan quickly traversed through South Korea and Japan before being last noted on 18:00 UTC, September 2.

In Taiwan, damages were considerable with 3,308 homes being destroyed and $3 million in crop damage were recorded. 11 people were killed and 74 people were injured during the onslaught of the storm. In mainland China, Joan caused 60 casualties, including 3 deaths. In South Korea, Joan caused several rivers on the Korean peninsula to overflow their banks, killing 17 people and injuring 21. Another 7,000 people were rendered homeless.

== Meteorological history ==
Map plotting the storm's track and intensity, according to the Saffir–Simpson scale Map key Saffir–Simpson scale Tropical depression (≤38 mph, ≤62 km/h) Tropical storm (39–73 mph, 63–118 km/h) Category 1 (74–95 mph, 119–153 km/h) Category 2 (96–110 mph, 154–177 km/h) Category 3 (111–129 mph, 178–208 km/h) Category 4 (130–156 mph, 209–251 km/h) Category 5 (≥157 mph, ≥252 km/h) Unknown Storm type Tropical cyclone Subtropical cyclone Extratropical cyclone, remnant low, tropical disturbance, or monsoon depression

On August 23, surface analyses indicated a surface center was forming northeast of Guam as winds in Guam are shifting from easterlies to the northerlies. On August 24, JMA began to track the developing system and classified the system as a tropical depression. (Note: The Japan Meteorological Agency is the official Regional Specialized Meteorological Center for the western Pacific Ocean.) A reconnaissance aircraft was sent to this area, and on August 25 at 03:25 UTC JTWC classified the system as a 40 knots (46 mph) tropical storm with JTWC giving the name Joan to the said storm. The new storm quickly intensified, as Joan became a typhoon in the midnight of the next day. By noon on the next day, Joan became a 85 knots (98 mph) typhoon while tracking to the west.

Most intense Pacific typhoons
| | Typhoon | Season | Pressure | |
| | Typhoon | Season | hPa | inHg |
|---|---|---|---|---|
| 1 | Tip | 1979 | 870 | 25.7 |
| 2 | June | 1975 | 875 | 25.8 |
| 2 | Nora | 1973 | 875 | 25.8 |
| 4 | Forrest | 1983 | 876 | 25.9 |
| 5 | Ida | 1958 | 877 | 25.9 |
| 6 | Rita | 1978 | 878 | 26.0 |
| 7 | Kit | 1966 | 880 | 26.0 |
| 7 | Vanessa | 1984 | 880 | 26.0 |
| 9 | Nancy | 1961 | 882 | 26.4 |
| 10 | Irma | 1971 | 884 | 26.1 |
Source: JMA Typhoon Best Track Analysis Information for the North Western Pacific Ocean.

As Joan began to intensify further into a 100 knots (120 mph) typhoon on August 27, Joan began to track northwestward with the speed of 10 knots (12 mph). On the next day, Joan rapidly intensified again for the second time as Joan began to increase movement speed up to 17 knots (20 mph), and by the midnight of August 29 Joan attained its peak intensity with the pressure of 885 millibars (26.1 inHg), which is tied with Nina as the most intense Pacific typhoon on the record at the time. In the next six hours before making landfall, Joan attained the peak strength as a Category 5 equivalent typhoon on the Saffir–Simpson hurricane scale with winds of 170 knots (200 mph), while the pressure rises up into 900 millibars (27 inHg). Shortly after reaching peak strength, Joan made landfall near Hualien City, Taiwan with the winds of 160 knots (180 mph). Joan quickly weakened after making landfall on Taiwan, with the winds falling into 110 knots (130 mph) after emerging in Strait of Taiwan at the midnight of August 30. Six hours later, Joan made landfall in Fujian, China with the intensity of 95 knots (109 mph) of August 30, with the slower speed of 10 knots (12 mph). Joan begins to slowly degenerate after the second landfall, though Joan remained on typhoon intensity for most of the day. However, by 18:00 UTC, Joan started to rapidly dissipate as JTWC published the last tropical cyclone warning on Joan. By the next day, Joan began recurving to the northeast while weakening further into a tropical storm. At 18:00 UTC on the same day, Joan transitioned into a extratropical cyclone while above Zhejiang, China. Emerging in the Yellow Sea as an extratropical low in the midnight of September 1, Joan quickly traversed through South Korea as a weak extratropical storm. By the evening of September 1, extratropical remnants of Joan emerged in the Sea of Japan. On September 2, extratropical remnants of Joan traversed through central Japan before being last noted at southeast of Tokyo in 18:00 UTC of the same day.

== Preparations and impact ==
=== Taiwan ===
Roughly 140,000 people were evacuated to safer buildings across Taiwan. More than 33,000 people were evacuated to public buildings in Taipei, and more than 6,600 took shelter in Keelung. Joan's approach disrupted international air traffic to the island for 36 hours. According to data from the JTWC, Joan's sustained winds upon its Taiwan landfall were among the strongest in recorded history. Excess winds of 50 knots (58 mph) were reported in weather stations across Taiwan after Joan made landfall with considerable damages reported. At least 11 people were killed by Joan in Taiwan, and another 74 people were injured. The storm also destroyed 3,308 homes and caused $3 million in crop damage. The counties of Nantou and Pingtung bore the brunt of crop damage, with significant losses reported to banana, papaya, and rice. The loss of 20,000 banana trees in Nantou was valued at $555,000. About 50,000 homes were evacuated in Fuzhou.

=== Others ===
About 50,000 homes were evacuated in Fuzhou as the typhoon nears landfall. There were 60 casualties, including 3 deaths. Rainfall from Joan caused several rivers on the Korean Peninsula to overflow their banks, killing 17 people and injuring 21. Another 7,000 people were rendered homeless.

== See also ==
- Other tropical cyclones named Joan
- Typhoon Bilis (2000)
- Typhoon Goni (2020)
