= List of storms named Joan =

The name Joan has been used for one tropical cyclone in the Atlantic Ocean, ten tropical cyclones in the Western Pacific, and two tropical cyclones in the Australian region.

In the Atlantic:

- Hurricane Joan (1988) – passed over the Guajira Peninsula in northern Colombia and northwestern Venezuela before making landfall in Nicaragua. After crossing Central America into the Eastern Pacific, Joan was renamed Miriam.

The name Joan was retired in the Atlantic after the 1988 season, and it was replaced by Joyce for the 1994 season.

In the West Pacific:

- Typhoon Joan (1951) (T5105) – did not affect land.
- Typhoon Joan (1955) (T5520) – did not affect land.
- Typhoon Joan (1959) (T5909, 21W) – a Category 5-equivalent typhoon that made landfall on Taiwan.
- Typhoon Joan (1962) (T6205, 37W) – hit South Korea.
- Tropical Storm Joan (1964) (T6429, 44W) – a relatively weak storm which hit Vietnam and became one of the Western Pacific's deadliest systems, killing at least 7,000 people.
- Tropical Storm Joan (1967) (T6717, 20W) – a long-lived tropical storm that did not affect land.
- Typhoon Joan (1970) (T7019, 21W, Sening) – a powerful and devastating typhoon that impacted southeastern Luzon as a Category 5-equivalent typhoon and eastern Hainan island as a Category 1-equivalent typhoon.
- Tropical Storm Joan (1973) (T7311, 12W, Elang) – approached Taiwan and struck China.
- Typhoon Joan (1976) (T7621, 21W) – did not affect land.
- Typhoon Joan (1997) (T9724, 28W) – passed between Anatahan and Saipan in the Northern Mariana Islands as a Category 5-equivalent typhoon.

In the Australian region:

- Cyclone Joan (1965)
- Cyclone Joan (1975) – a Category 5 severe tropical cyclone that made landfall in Western Australia at peak intensity.

The name Joan was retired in the Australian region after its usage for the 1975 cyclone.

== See also ==
- Cyclone Joaninha (2019) – an intense tropical cyclone in the South-West Indian Ocean with a similar name.
