= List of storms named Rosing =

The name Rosing was used in the Philippines by the Philippine Weather Bureau and its successor, PAGASA for nine tropical cyclones in the Western Pacific.

- Typhoon Kit (1963) (T6318, 35W, Rosing) – became a Category 4-equivalent super typhoon but did not affect any land areas.
- Typhoon Marge (1967) (T6718, 22W, Rosing) – a strong typhoon that skirted the northeastern coast of Luzon.
- Typhoon Lucy (1971) (T7116, 17W, Rosing) – another powerful typhoon which brushed the Philippines before making landfall in South China.
- Typhoon June (1975) (T7520, 23W, Rosing) – one of the most intense tropical cyclones on record, reaching 875 millibars.
- Typhoon Owen (1979) (T7915, 19W, Rosing) – a strong typhoon that struck southwestern Japan and caused 12 deaths.
- Tropical Storm Kim (1983) (T8315, 16W, Rosing) – struck Indochina before crossing into the North Indian Ocean basin, causing at least 300 reported deaths in Thailand and Bangladesh.
- Tropical Storm Maury (1987) (T8721, 21W, Rosing) – struck the Philippines and Vietnam.
- Typhoon Mireille (1991) (T9119, 21W, Rosing) – struck Japan and became the country's costliest typhoon ever.
- Typhoon Angela (1995) (T9520, 29W, Rosing) – a strong Category 5-equivalent typhoon that caused 882 fatalities and severe damage across the Philippines.

The name Rosing was retired because of the destruction it caused in the Philippines in 1995, and was replaced by Rening, which was only used in 1999 after PAGASA implemented a new naming scheme in 2001.
