= List of the most intense tropical cyclones =

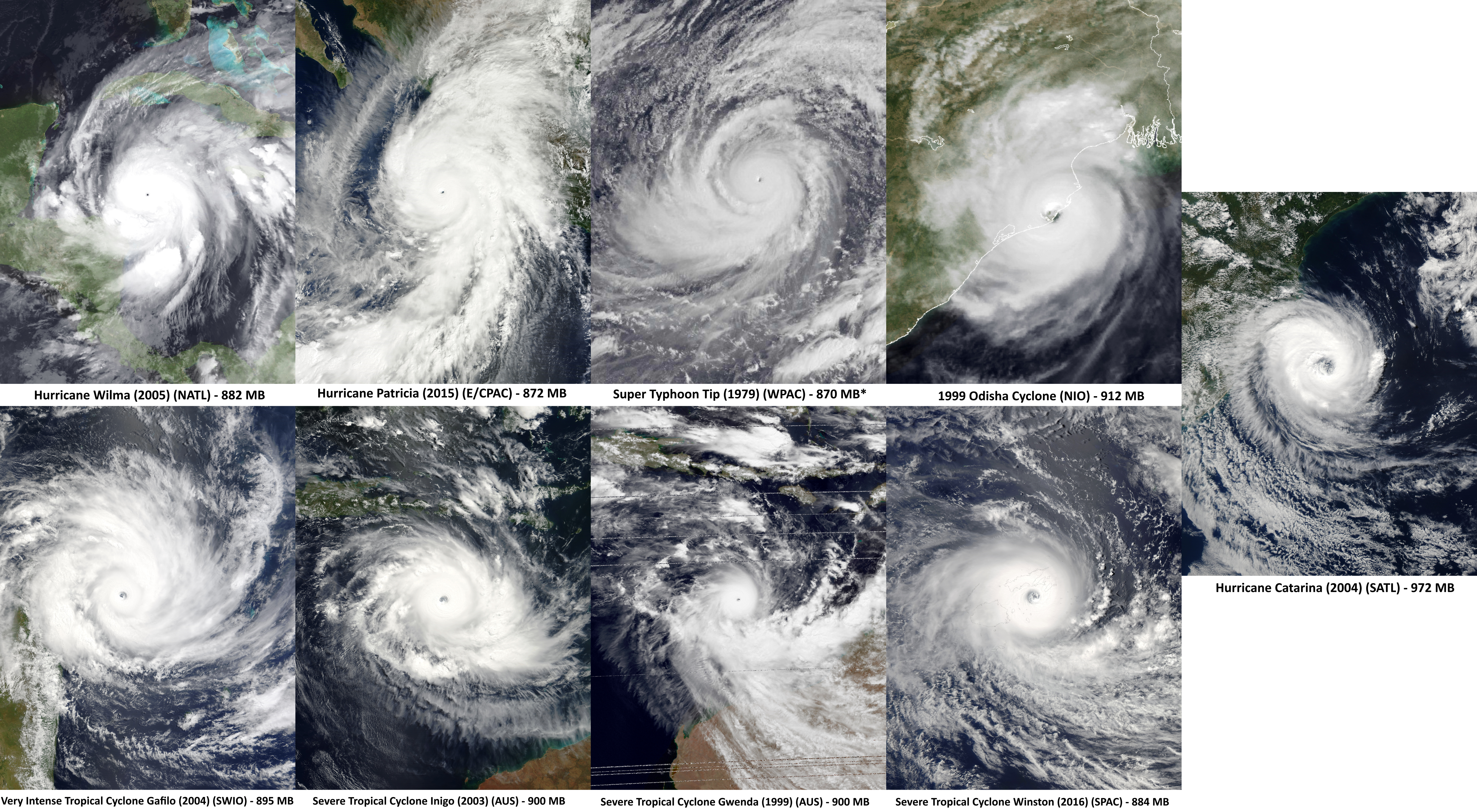
Taken by various of satellites throughout the modern era, these are the most intense tropical cyclones in each basin. Out of all these tropical cyclones, Typhoon Tip had the lowest atmospheric pressure measured in a tropical cyclone, at 870 mbar (25.69 inHg). It is the third image in the first row.

This is a list of the most intense tropical cyclones as measured by minimum atmospheric pressure at sea level. Although maximum sustained winds are often used to measure intensity as they commonly cause notable impacts over large areas, and most popular tropical cyclone scales are organized around sustained wind speeds, variations in the averaging period of winds in different basins make inter-comparison difficult. In addition, other impacts like rainfall, storm surge, area of wind damage, and tornadoes can vary significantly in storms with similar wind speeds. The minimum central pressure at sea level is often used to compare tropical cyclones because the measurements are easier and use consistent methodology worldwide, in contrast to difficult-to-estimate maximum sustained winds whose measurement methods vary widely. Tropical cyclones can attain some of the lowest pressures over large areas on Earth. However, although there is a strong connection between lowered pressures and higher wind speeds, storms with the lowest pressures may not have the highest wind speeds, as each storm's relationship between wind and pressure is slightly different.

In the most recent and reliable records, most tropical cyclones which attained a pressure of 900 hPa (mbar) (26.56 inHg) or less have occurred in the Western North Pacific Ocean. The strongest tropical cyclone recorded worldwide, as measured by minimum central pressure, was Typhoon Tip, which reached a pressure of 870 hPa (25.69 inHg) on October 12, 1979. Furthermore, on October 23, 2015, Hurricane Patricia attained the strongest 1-minute sustained winds on record at 185 knots (95 m/s; 215 mph; 345 km/h).

Data for the most intense tropical cyclones globally are provided below, then subdivided by basin. Data listed are provided by the official Regional Specialized Meteorological Centre, unless otherwise noted.

== North Atlantic Ocean ==
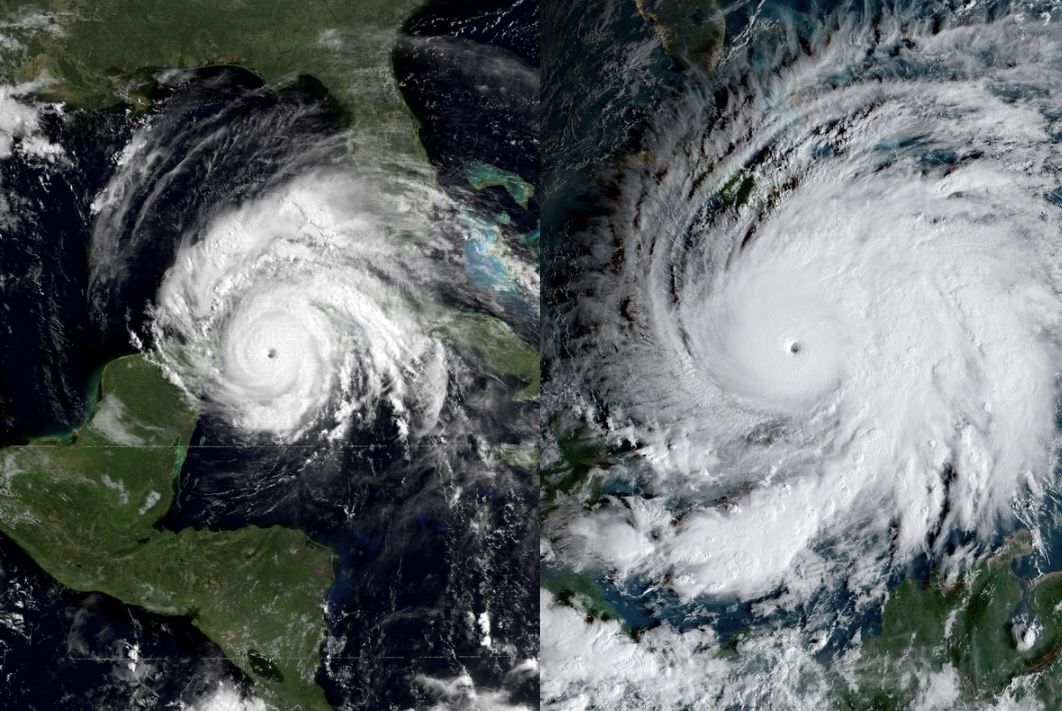
Hurricane Allen (left) and Hurricane Melissa (right) at their respective peak intensities, peaking with the highest winds in a tropical cyclone ever recorded in the Atlantic basin

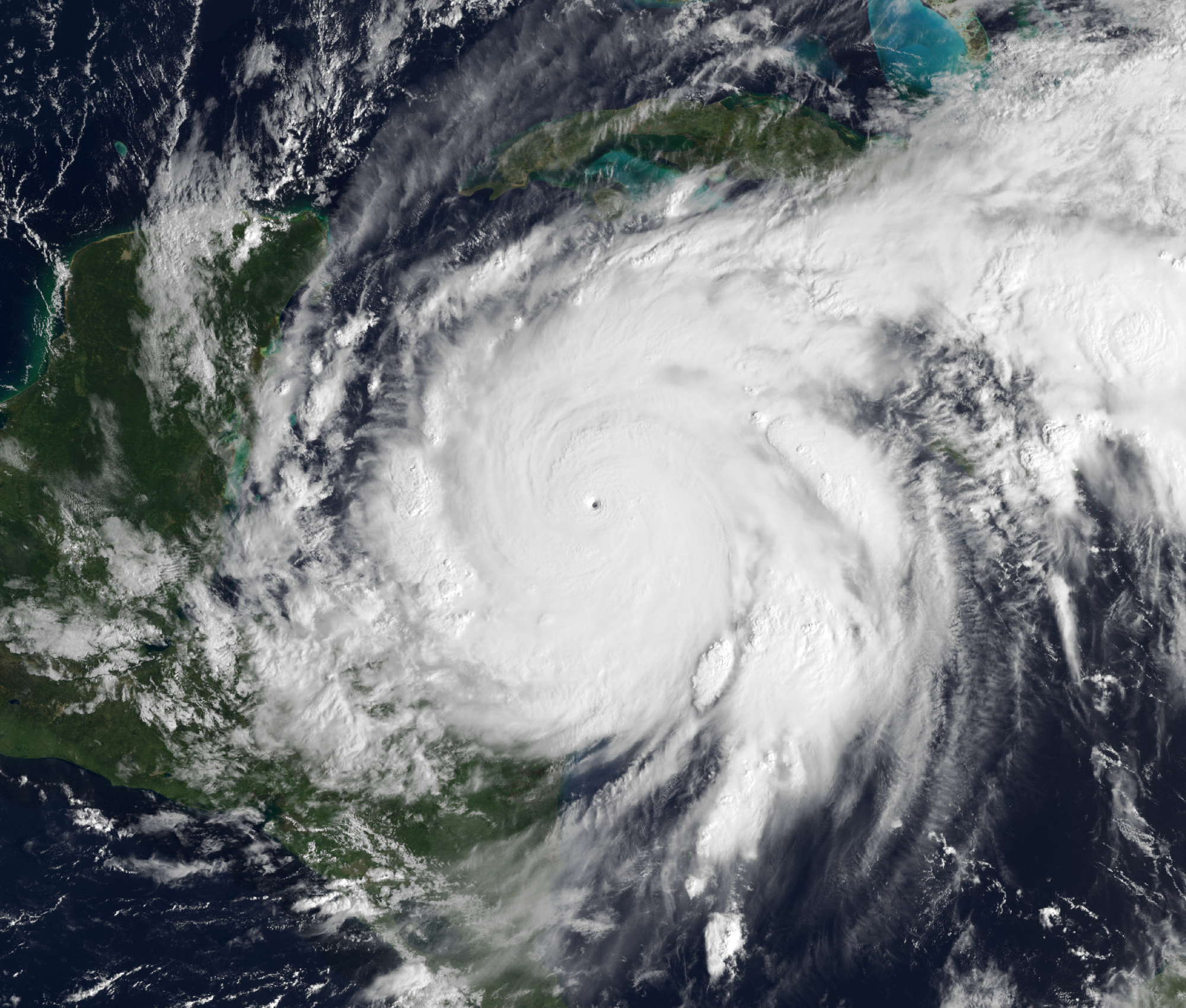
Hurricane Wilma at peak intensity, peaking with the lowest pressure in a tropical cyclone ever recorded in the Atlantic basin

The most intense storm in the North Atlantic by lowest pressure was Hurricane Wilma. The strongest storms by 1-minute sustained winds were Hurricane Allen and Hurricane Melissa.

Storms which reached a minimum central pressure of 920 millibars (27.17 inHg) or less are listed. Storm information has been compiled back to 1851, though measurements were rarer until aircraft reconnaissance started in the 1940s, and inexact estimates were still predominant until dropsondes were implemented in the 1970s.

Cyclone	Season	Peak classification	Peak 1-min sustained winds	Pressure
"Cuba"	1924	Category 5 hurricane	270 km/h (165 mph)	910 hPa (26.87 inHg)
"Cuba"	1932	Category 5 hurricane	280 km/h (175 mph)	915 hPa (27.02 inHg)
"Labor Day"	1935	Category 5 hurricane	295 km/h (185 mph)	892 hPa (26.34 inHg)
"Great Atlantic"	1944	Category 5 hurricane	260 km/h (160 mph)	918 hPa (27.11 inHg)
Janet	1955	Category 5 hurricane	280 km/h (175 mph)	914 hPa (26.99 inHg)
Esther	1961	Category 5 hurricane	260 km/h (160 mph)	919 hPa (27.14 inHg)
Hattie	1961	Category 5 hurricane	270 km/h (165 mph)	914 hPa (26.99 inHg)
Camille	1969	Category 5 hurricane	280 km/h (175 mph)	900 hPa (26.58 inHg)
Allen	1980	Category 5 hurricane	305 km/h (190 mph)	899 hPa (26.55 inHg)
Gloria	1985	Category 4 hurricane	230 km/h (145 mph)	920 hPa (27.17 inHg)
Gilbert	1988	Category 5 hurricane	295 km/h (185 mph)	888 hPa (26.22 inHg)
Hugo	1989	Category 5 hurricane	260 km/h (160 mph)	918 hPa (27.11 inHg)
Opal	1995	Category 4 hurricane	240 km/h (150 mph)	916 hPa (27.05 inHg)
Mitch	1998	Category 5 hurricane	285 km/h (180 mph)	905 hPa (26.72 inHg)
Isabel	2003	Category 5 hurricane	270 km/h (165 mph)	915 hPa (27.02 inHg)
Ivan	2004	Category 5 hurricane	270 km/h (165 mph)	910 hPa (26.87 inHg)
Katrina	2005	Category 5 hurricane	280 km/h (175 mph)	902 hPa (26.64 inHg)
Rita	2005	Category 5 hurricane	285 km/h (180 mph)	895 hPa (26.43 inHg)
Wilma	2005	Category 5 hurricane	295 km/h (185 mph)	882 hPa (26.05 inHg)
Dean	2007	Category 5 hurricane	280 km/h (175 mph)	905 hPa (26.72 inHg)
Irma	2017	Category 5 hurricane	285 km/h (180 mph)	914 hPa (26.99 inHg)
Maria	2017	Category 5 hurricane	280 km/h (175 mph)	908 hPa (26.81 inHg)
Michael	2018	Category 5 hurricane	260 km/h (160 mph)	919 hPa (27.14 inHg)
Dorian	2019	Category 5 hurricane	295 km/h (185 mph)	910 hPa (26.87 inHg)
Iota	2020	Category 4 hurricane	250 km/h (155 mph)	917 hPa (27.08 inHg)
Milton	2024	Category 5 hurricane	285 km/h (180 mph)	895 hPa (26.43 inHg)
Erin	2025	Category 5 hurricane	260 km/h (160 mph)	913 hPa (26.96 inHg)
Humberto	2025	Category 5 hurricane	260 km/h (160 mph)	918 hPa (27.11 inHg)
Melissa	2025	Category 5 hurricane	305 km/h (190 mph)	892 hPa (26.34 inHg)
Source: Atlantic Hurricane Best Track File 1851–2025 (NHC)

== Eastern Pacific Ocean ==
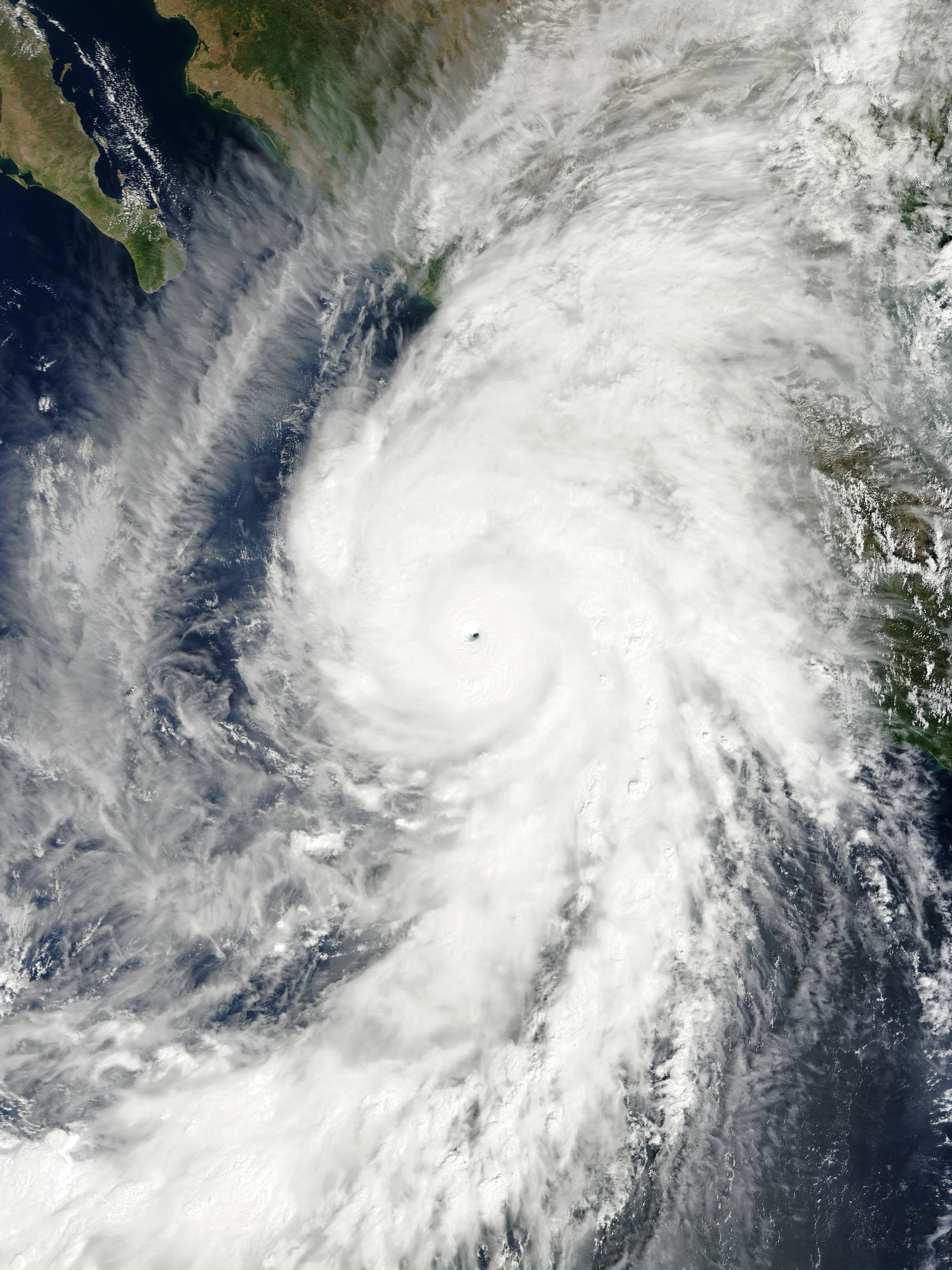
Hurricane Patricia shortly after peak intensity, highest global sustained winds and lowest pressure in the Western Hemisphere

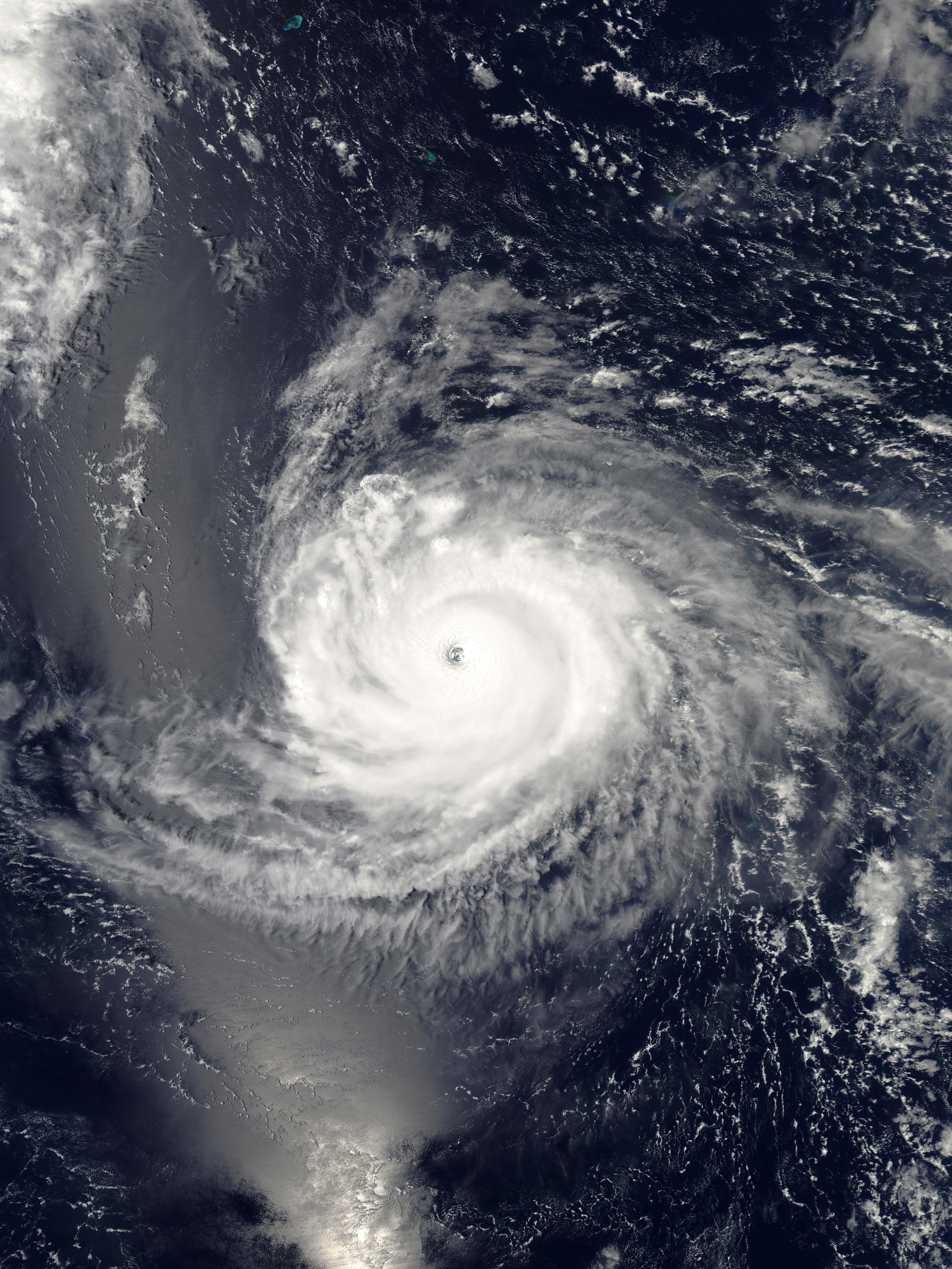
Hurricane Ioke at its record peak intensity, also the most intense hurricane ever recorded in the Central Pacific

The most intense storm in the Eastern Pacific Ocean by both sustained winds and central pressure was Hurricane Patricia. Its sustained winds of 345 km/h (215 mph) are also the highest on record globally.

Storms with a minimum central pressure of 925 hPa (27.32 inHg) or less are listed. Storm information was less reliably documented and recorded before 1949, and most storms since are only estimated because landfalls (and related reconnaissance) are less common in this basin.

Cyclone	Season	Peak classification	Peak 1-min sustained winds	Pressure
Ava	1973	Category 5 hurricane	260 km/h (160 mph)	915 hPa (27.02 inHg)
Annette	1976	Category 4 hurricane	220 km/h (140 mph)	925 hPa (27.32 inHg)
Trudy	1990	Category 4 hurricane	250 km/h (155 mph)	924 hPa (27.29 inHg)
Gilma	1994	Category 5 hurricane	260 km/h (160 mph)	920 hPa (27.17 inHg)
Olivia	1994	Category 4 hurricane	240 km/h (150 mph)	923 hPa (27.26 inHg)
Guillermo	1997	Category 5 hurricane	260 km/h (160 mph)	919 hPa (27.14 inHg)
Linda	1997	Category 5 hurricane	295 km/h (185 mph)	902 hPa (26.64 inHg)
Juliette	2001	Category 4 hurricane	230 km/h (145 mph)	923 hPa (27.26 inHg)
Elida	2002	Category 5 hurricane	260 km/h (160 mph)	921 hPa (27.20 inHg)
Hernan	2002	Category 5 hurricane	260 km/h (160 mph)	921 hPa (27.20 inHg)
Kenna	2002	Category 5 hurricane	270 km/h (165 mph)	913 hPa (26.96 inHg)
Ioke	2006	Category 5 hurricane	260 km/h (160 mph)	915 hPa (27.02 inHg)
Rick	2009	Category 5 hurricane	285 km/h (180 mph)	906 hPa (26.75 inHg)
Celia	2010	Category 5 hurricane	260 km/h (160 mph)	921 hPa (27.20 inHg)
Marie	2014	Category 5 hurricane	260 km/h (160 mph)	918 hPa (27.11 inHg)
Odile	2014	Category 4 hurricane	220 km/h (140 mph)	918 hPa (27.11 inHg)
Patricia	2015	Category 5 hurricane	345 km/h (215 mph)	872 hPa (25.75 inHg)
Walaka	2018	Category 5 hurricane	260 km/h (160 mph)	921 hPa (27.20 inHg)
Willa	2018	Category 5 hurricane	260 km/h (160 mph)	925 hPa (27.32 inHg)
Otis	2023	Category 5 hurricane	270 km/h (165 mph)	922 hPa (27.23 inHg)
Genevieve	2026	Category 5 hurricane	260 km/h (160 mph)	924 hPa (27.29 inHg)
Lowell	2026	Category 5 hurricane	260 km/h (160 mph)	922 hPa (27.23 inHg)
Polo	2026	Category 5 hurricane	285 km/h (180 mph)	892 hPa (26.34 inHg)
Source: East Pacific Hurricane Best Track File 1949–2025 (NHC)

== Western Pacific Ocean ==
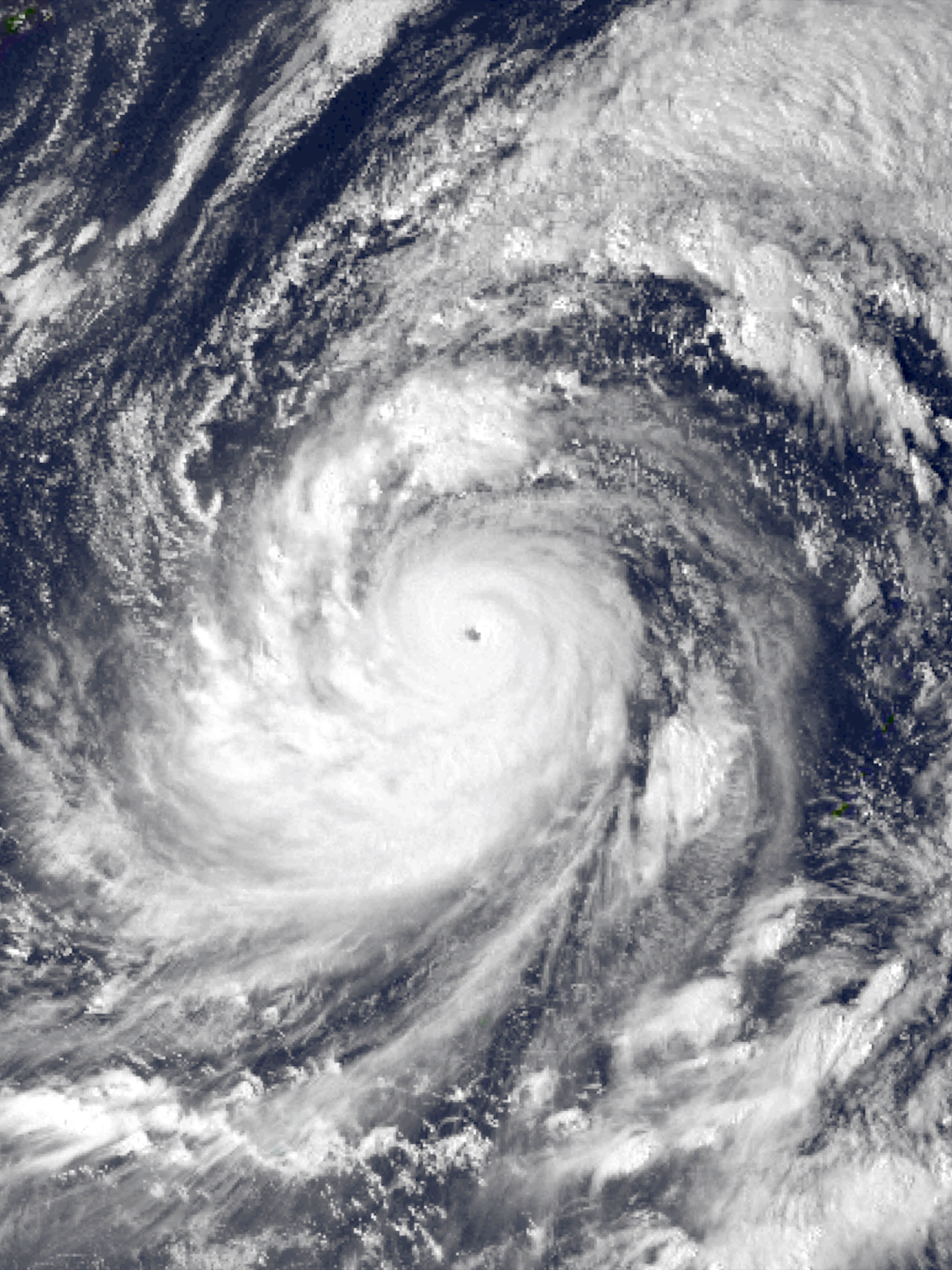
Typhoon Tip at its record peak intensity on October 12

The most intense storm by lowest pressure and peak 10-minute sustained winds was Typhoon Tip, which was also the most intense tropical cyclone ever recorded in terms of minimum central pressure.

Storms with a minimum pressure of 899 hPa (26.55 inHg) or less are listed. Storm information was less reliably documented and recorded before 1950.

Cyclone	Year	Peak classification	Peak 10-min sustained winds	Pressure
Unnamed	1927	Unknown	Not specified	887 hPa (26.19 inHg)
Allyn	1949	Violent typhoon	Not specified	884 hPa (26.10 inHg)
Clara	1950	Violent typhoon	Not specified	899 hPa (26.55 inHg)
Marge	1951	Violent typhoon	Not specified	886 hPa (26.16 inHg)
Wilma	1952	Violent typhoon	Not specified	893 hPa (26.37 inHg)
Nina	1953	Violent typhoon	Not specified	885 hPa (26.13 inHg)
Ida	1954	Violent typhoon	Not specified	890 hPa (26.28 inHg)
Ida	1958	Violent typhoon	Not specified	877 hPa (25.90 inHg)
Vera	1959	Violent typhoon	Not specified	895 hPa (26.43 inHg)
Joan	1959	Violent typhoon	Not specified	885 hPa (26.13 inHg)
Nancy	1961	Violent typhoon	Not specified	882 hPa (26.05 inHg)
Violet	1961	Violent typhoon	Not specified	895 hPa (26.43 inHg)
Emma	1962	Violent typhoon	Not specified	890 hPa (26.28 inHg)
Karen	1962	Violent typhoon	Not specified	894 hPa (26.40 inHg)
Sally	1964	Violent typhoon	220 km/h (140 mph)	895 hPa (26.43 inHg)
Wilda	1964	Violent typhoon	Not specified	895 hPa (26.43 inHg)
Opal	1964	Violent typhoon	Not specified	895 hPa (26.43 inHg)
Kit	1966	Violent typhoon	Not specified	880 hPa (25.99 inHg)
Elsie	1969	Violent typhoon	Not specified	895 hPa (26.43 inHg)
Viola	1969	Violent typhoon	Not specified	896 hPa (26.46 inHg)
Hope	1970	Violent typhoon	Not specified	895 hPa (26.43 inHg)
Amy	1971	Violent typhoon	Not specified	890 hPa (26.28 inHg)
Irma	1971	Violent typhoon	Not specified	885 hPa (26.13 inHg)
Patsy	1973	Violent typhoon	Not specified	895 hPa (26.43 inHg)
Nora	1973	Violent typhoon	Not specified	875 hPa (25.84 inHg)
June	1975	Violent typhoon	Not specified	875 hPa (25.84 inHg)
Louise	1976	Violent typhoon	205 km/h (125 mph)	895 hPa (26.43 inHg)
Rita	1978	Violent typhoon	220 km/h (140 mph)	880 hPa (25.99 inHg)
Tip	1979	Violent typhoon	260 km/h (160 mph)	870 hPa (25.69 inHg)
Wynne	1980	Violent typhoon	220 km/h (140 mph)	890 hPa (26.28 inHg)
Elsie	1981	Violent typhoon	220 km/h (140 mph)	895 hPa (26.43 inHg)
Mac	1982	Violent typhoon	220 km/h (140 mph)	895 hPa (26.43 inHg)
Abby	1983	Violent typhoon	230 km/h (145 mph)	895 hPa (26.43 inHg)
Forrest	1983	Violent typhoon	205 km/h (125 mph)	885 hPa (26.13 inHg)
Marge	1983	Violent typhoon	205 km/h (125 mph)	895 hPa (26.43 inHg)
Vanessa	1984	Violent typhoon	220 km/h (140 mph)	880 hPa (25.99 inHg)
Dot	1985	Violent typhoon	220 km/h (140 mph)	895 hPa (26.43 inHg)
Betty	1987	Violent typhoon	205 km/h (125 mph)	890 hPa (26.28 inHg)
Flo	1990	Violent typhoon	220 km/h (140 mph)	890 hPa (26.28 inHg)
Ruth	1991	Violent typhoon	215 km/h (130 mph)	895 hPa (26.43 inHg)
Yuri	1991	Violent typhoon	220 km/h (140 mph)	895 hPa (26.43 inHg)
Megi	2010	Violent typhoon	230 km/h (145 mph)	885 hPa (26.13 inHg)
Haiyan	2013	Violent typhoon	230 km/h (145 mph)	895 hPa (26.43 inHg)
Meranti	2016	Violent typhoon	220 km/h (140 mph)	890 hPa (26.28 inHg)
Surigae	2021	Violent typhoon	220 km/h (140 mph)	895 hPa (26.43 inHg)
Source: Western North Pacific Typhoon Best Track File 1951–2026 (JMA)

== North Indian Ocean ==
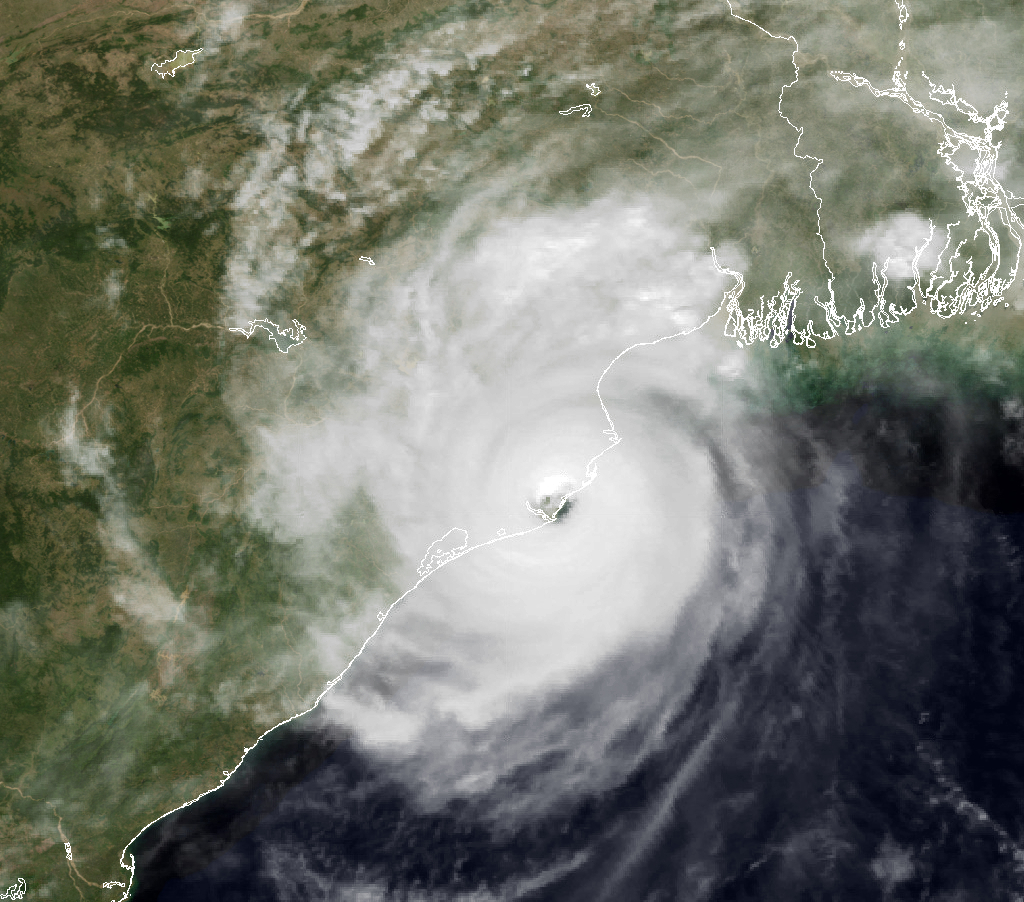
Satellite image of the Odisha cyclone of 1999 as it made landfall in Odisha

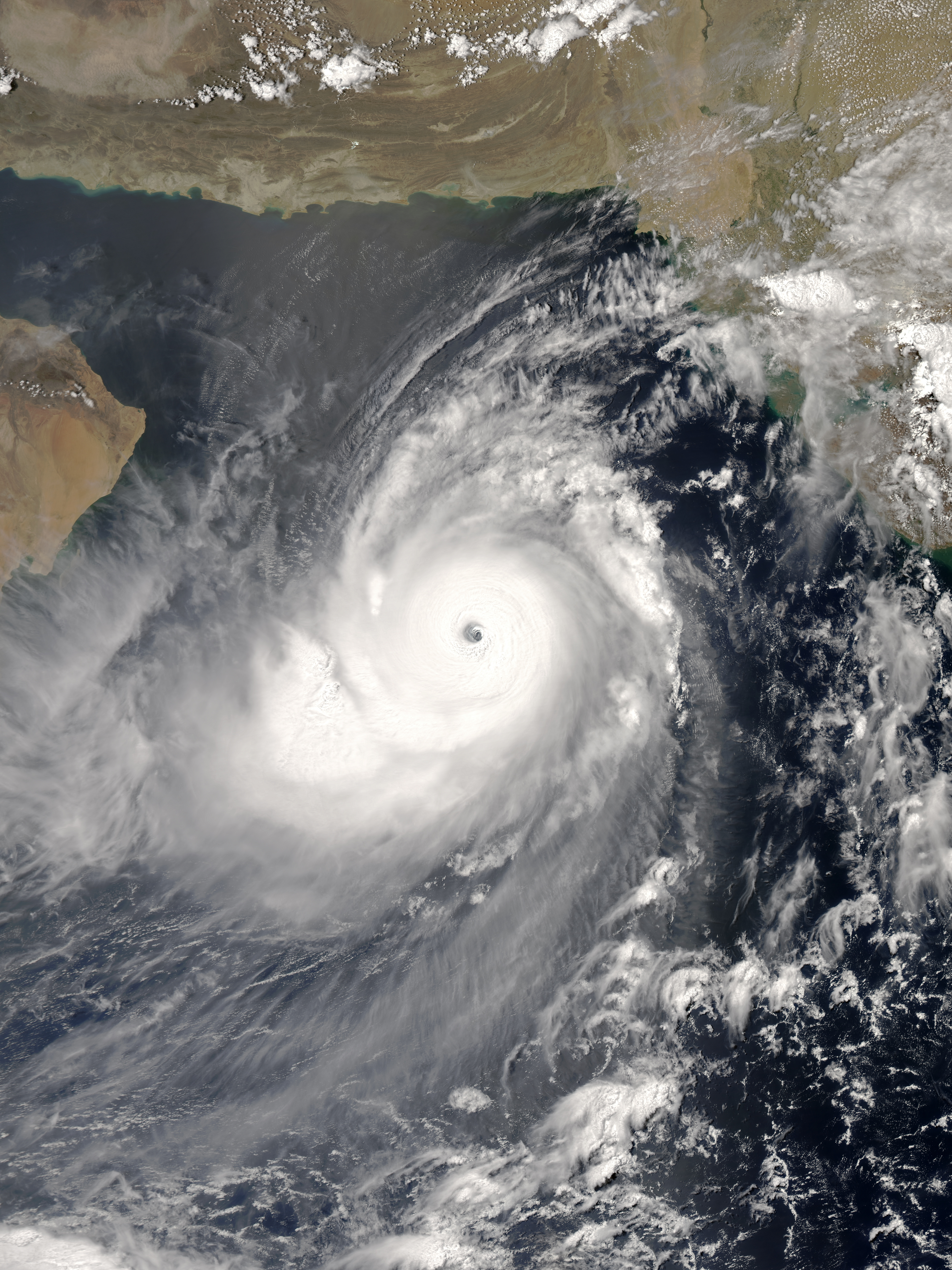
Cyclone Gonu near peak intensity, also the most intense tropical cyclone in Arabian Sea

The most intense tropical cyclone in the North Indian Ocean by both sustained winds and central pressure was the 1999 Odisha cyclone, with 3-minute sustained winds of 260 km/h (160 mph) and a minimum pressure of 912 hPa (26.93 inHg).

Storms with an intensity of 950 hPa (28.05 inHg) or less are listed.

Cyclone	Season	Peak classification	Peak 3-min sustained winds	Pressure	Refs
Two	1963	Extremely severe cyclonic storm	195 km/h (120 mph)	947 hPa (27.96 inHg)	
Three	1963	Super cyclonic storm	240 km/h (150 mph)	920 hPa (27.17 inHg)	
1977 Andhra Pradesh	1977	Super cyclonic storm	230 km/h (145 mph)	943 hPa (27.85 inHg)	
Unnamed	1978	Extremely severe cyclonic storm	205 km/h (125 mph)	940 hPa (27.76 inHg)	
1978 Sri Lanka	1978	Super cyclonic storm	220 km/h (140 mph)	938 hPa (27.70 inHg)	
Unnamed	1979	Extremely severe cyclonic storm	185 km/h (115 mph)	936 hPa (27.64 inHg)	
BOB 01	1982	Extremely severe cyclonic storm	215 km/h (130 mph)	940 hPa (27.76 inHg)	
Gay	1989	Super cyclonic storm	230 km/h (145 mph)	930 hPa (27.46 inHg)	
1990 Andhra Pradesh	1990	Super cyclonic storm	235 km/h (145 mph)	920 hPa (27.17 inHg)	
1991 Bangladesh	1991	Super cyclonic storm	235 km/h (145 mph)	918 hPa (27.11 inHg)	
1994 BOB 02	1994	Extremely severe cyclonic storm	215 km/h (130 mph)	940 hPa (27.76 inHg)	
1999 Pakistan	1999	Extremely severe cyclonic storm	195 km/h (120 mph)	946 hPa (27.94 inHg)	
1999 Odisha	1999	Super cyclonic storm	260 km/h (160 mph)	912 hPa (26.93 inHg)	
2001 Gujarat	2001	Extremely severe cyclonic storm	215 km/h (130 mph)	932 hPa (27.52 inHg)	
Gonu	2007	Super cyclonic storm	240 km/h (150 mph)	920 hPa (27.17 inHg)	
Sidr	2007	Extremely severe cyclonic storm	215 km/h (130 mph)	944 hPa (27.88 inHg)	
Giri	2010	Extremely severe cyclonic storm	195 km/h (120 mph)	950 hPa (28.05 inHg)	
Phailin	2013	Extremely severe cyclonic storm	215 km/h (130 mph)	940 hPa (27.76 inHg)	
Hudhud	2014	Extremely severe cyclonic storm	185 km/h (115 mph)	950 hPa (28.05 inHg)	
Nilofar	2014	Extremely severe cyclonic storm	205 km/h (125 mph)	950 hPa (28.05 inHg)	
Chapala	2015	Extremely severe cyclonic storm	215 km/h (130 mph)	940 hPa (27.76 inHg)	
Fani	2019	Extremely severe cyclonic storm	215 km/h (130 mph)	932 hPa (27.52 inHg)	
Kyarr	2019	Super cyclonic storm	240 km/h (150 mph)	922 hPa (27.23 inHg)	
Amphan	2020	Super cyclonic storm	240 km/h (150 mph)	920 hPa (27.17 inHg)	
Tauktae	2021	Extremely severe cyclonic storm	185 km/h (115 mph)	950 hPa (28.05 inHg)	
Mocha	2023	Extremely severe cyclonic storm	215 km/h (130 mph)	938 hPa (27.70 inHg)	

== South-West Indian Ocean ==
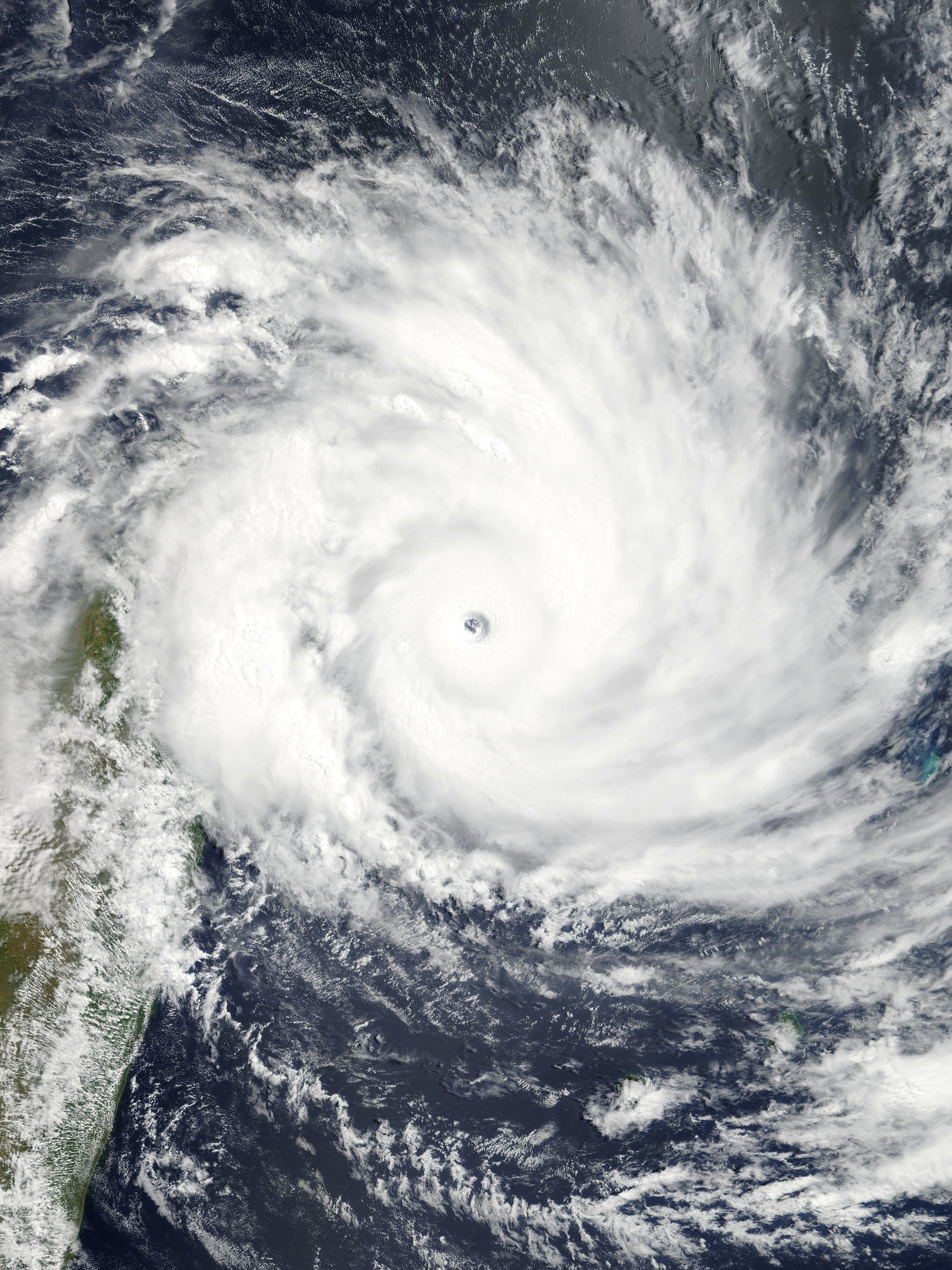
Cyclone Gafilo shortly before peak intensity

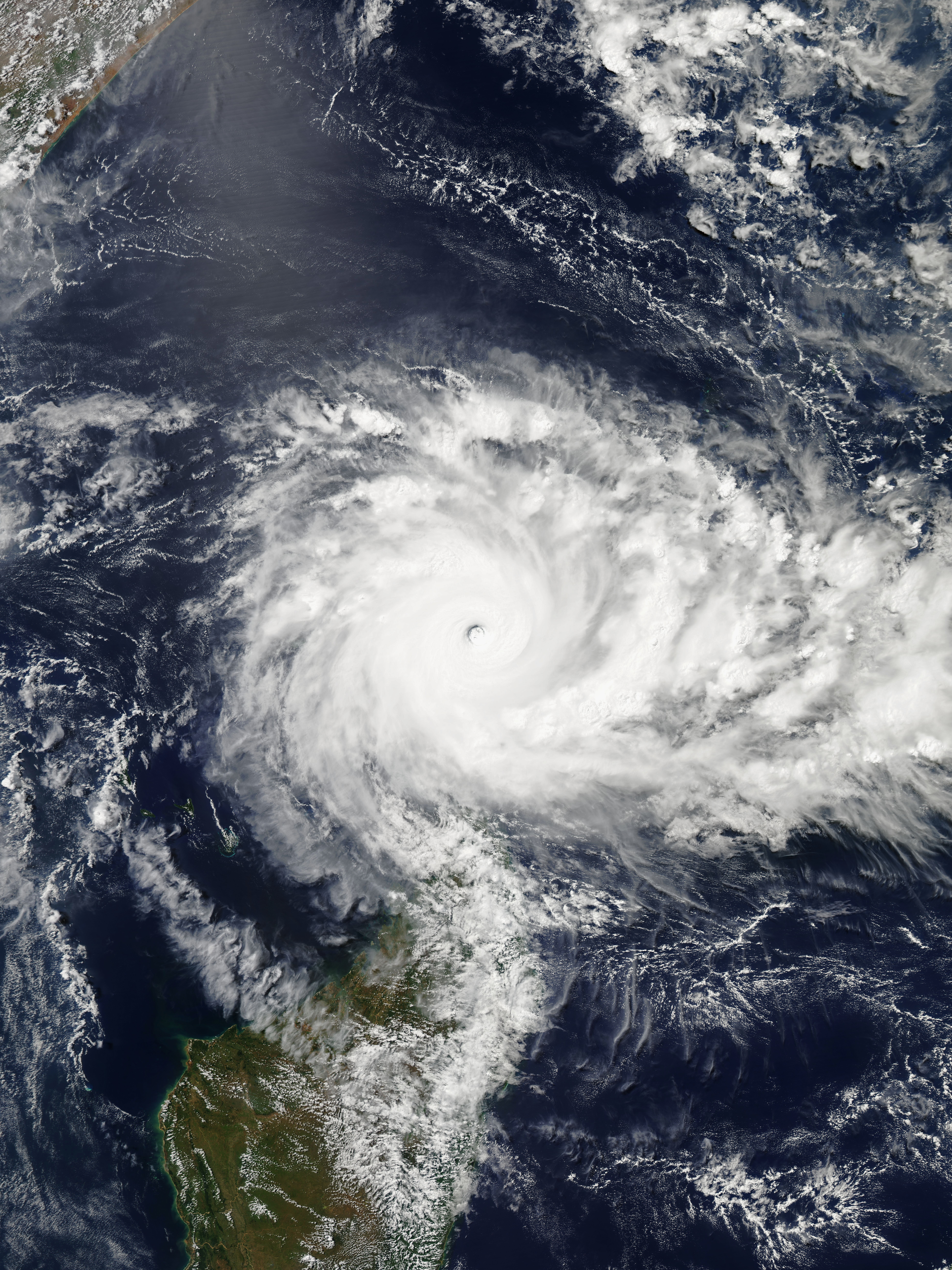
Cyclone Fantala shortly after peak intensity

The most intense tropical cyclone in the South-West Indian Ocean was Cyclone Gafilo. By 10-minute sustained wind speed, the strongest tropical cyclone in the South-West Indian Ocean was Cyclone Fantala.

Storms with an intensity of 920 hPa (27.17 inHg) or less are listed. Storm information was less reliably documented and recorded before 1985.

Cyclone	Season	Peak classification	Peak 10-min sustained winds	Pressure
Chris–Damia	1981–82	Intense tropical cyclone	215 km/h (130 mph)	898 hPa (26.52 inHg)
Geralda	1993–94	Intense tropical cyclone	205 km/h (125 mph)	905 hPa (26.72 inHg)
Litanne	1993–94	Intense tropical cyclone	195 km/h (120 mph)	910 hPa (26.87 inHg)
Marlene	1994–95	Intense tropical cyclone	185 km/h (115 mph)	920 hPa (27.17 inHg)
Bonita	1995–96	Intense tropical cyclone	185 km/h (115 mph)	920 hPa (27.17 inHg)
Daniella	1996–97	Intense tropical cyclone	195 km/h (120 mph)	915 hPa (27.02 inHg)
Hudah	1999–2000	Very Intense tropical cyclone	220 km/h (140 mph)	905 hPa (26.72 inHg)
Dina	2001–02	Intense tropical cyclone	215 km/h (130 mph)	910 hPa (26.87 inHg)
Guillaume	2001–02	Intense tropical cyclone	205 km/h (125 mph)	920 hPa (27.17 inHg)
Hary	2001–02	Very Intense tropical cyclone	220 km/h (140 mph)	905 hPa (26.72 inHg)
Kalunde	2002–03	Intense tropical cyclone	215 km/h (130 mph)	905 hPa (26.72 inHg)
Gafilo	2003–04	Very Intense tropical cyclone	230 km/h (145 mph)	895 hPa (26.43 inHg)
Adeline–Juliet	2004–05	Very Intense tropical cyclone	220 km/h (140 mph)	905 hPa (26.72 inHg)
Bento	2004–05	Intense tropical cyclone	215 km/h (130 mph)	915 hPa (27.02 inHg)
Carina	2005–06	Intense tropical cyclone	205 km/h (125 mph)	915 hPa (27.02 inHg)
Hondo	2007–08	Intense tropical cyclone	215 km/h (130 mph)	915 hPa (27.02 inHg)
Edzani	2009–10	Very Intense tropical cyclone	220 km/h (140 mph)	910 hPa (26.87 inHg)
Bruce	2013–14	Very Intense tropical cyclone	220 km/h (140 mph)	920 hPa (27.17 inHg)
Colin	2013–14	Intense tropical cyclone	205 km/h (125 mph)	915 hPa (27.02 inHg)
Hellen	2013–14	Very Intense tropical cyclone	230 km/h (145 mph)	915 hPa (27.02 inHg)
Bansi	2014–15	Very Intense tropical cyclone	220 km/h (140 mph)	910 hPa (26.87 inHg)
Eunice	2014–15	Very Intense tropical cyclone	230 km/h (145 mph)	915 hPa (27.02 inHg)
Fantala	2015–16	Very Intense tropical cyclone	250 km/h (155 mph)	910 hPa (26.87 inHg)
Djoungou	2023–24	Intense tropical cyclone	215 km/h (130 mph)	920 hPa (27.17 inHg)

== Australian region ==
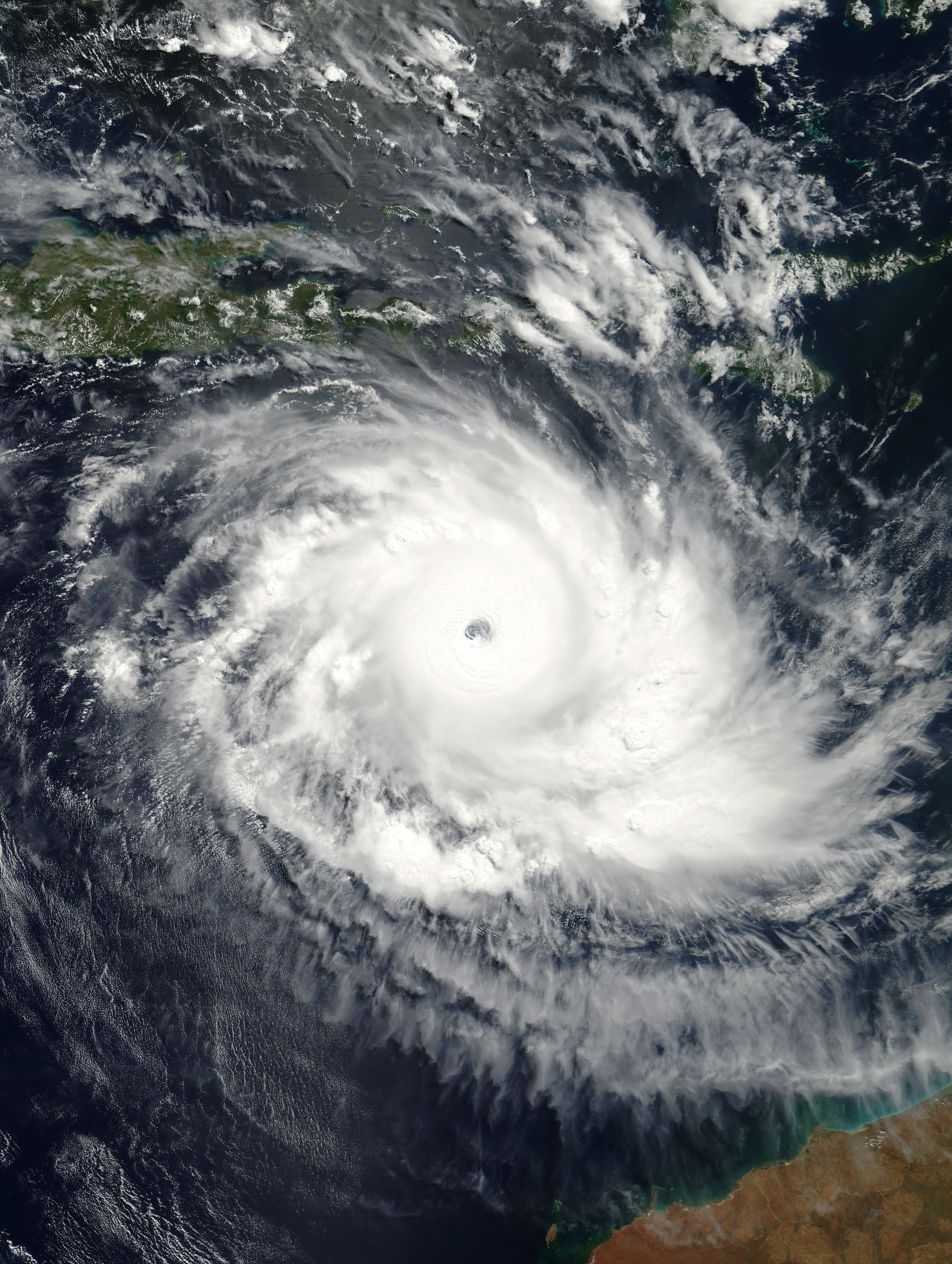
Cyclone Inigo near peak intensity

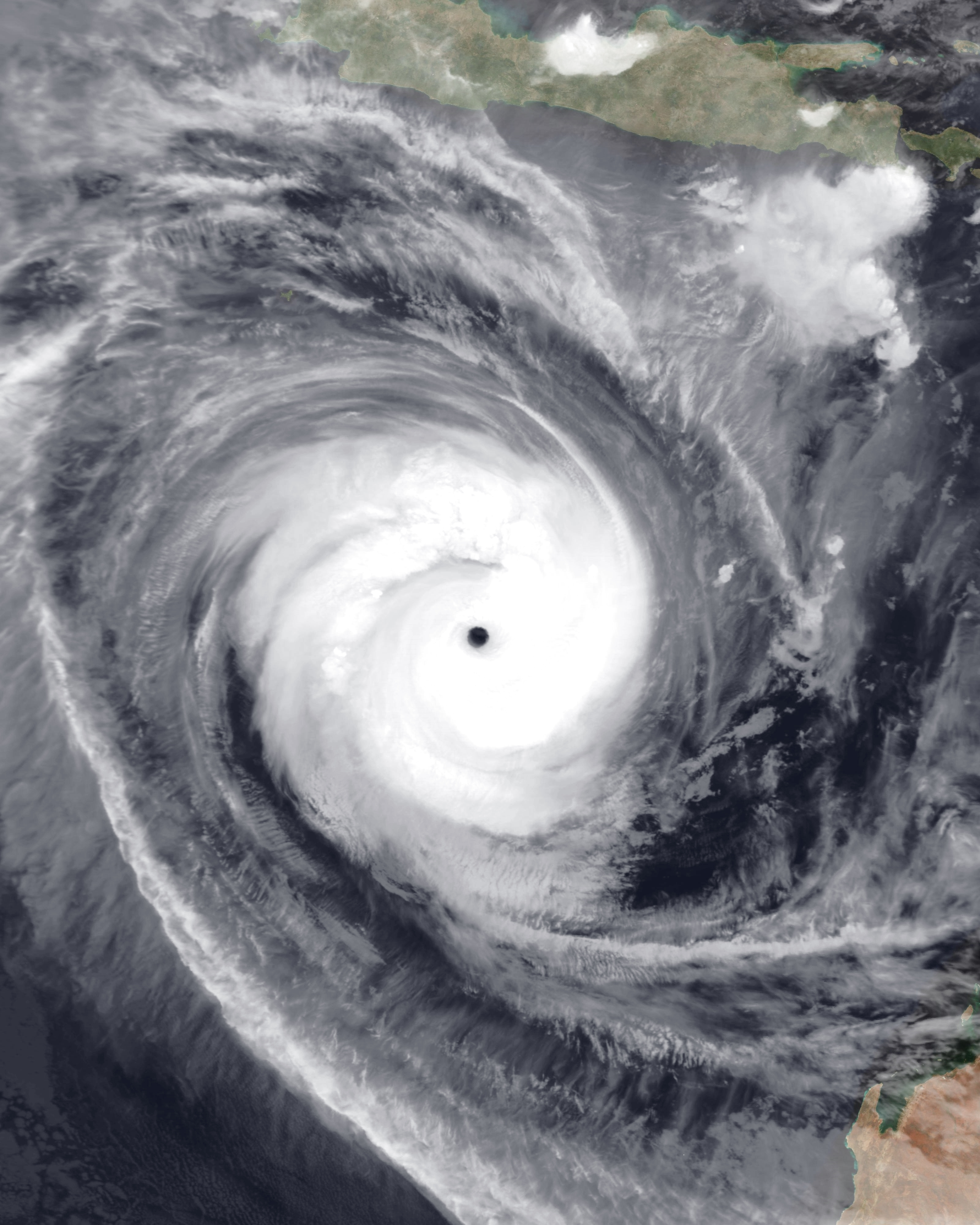
Cyclone Marcus at peak intensity

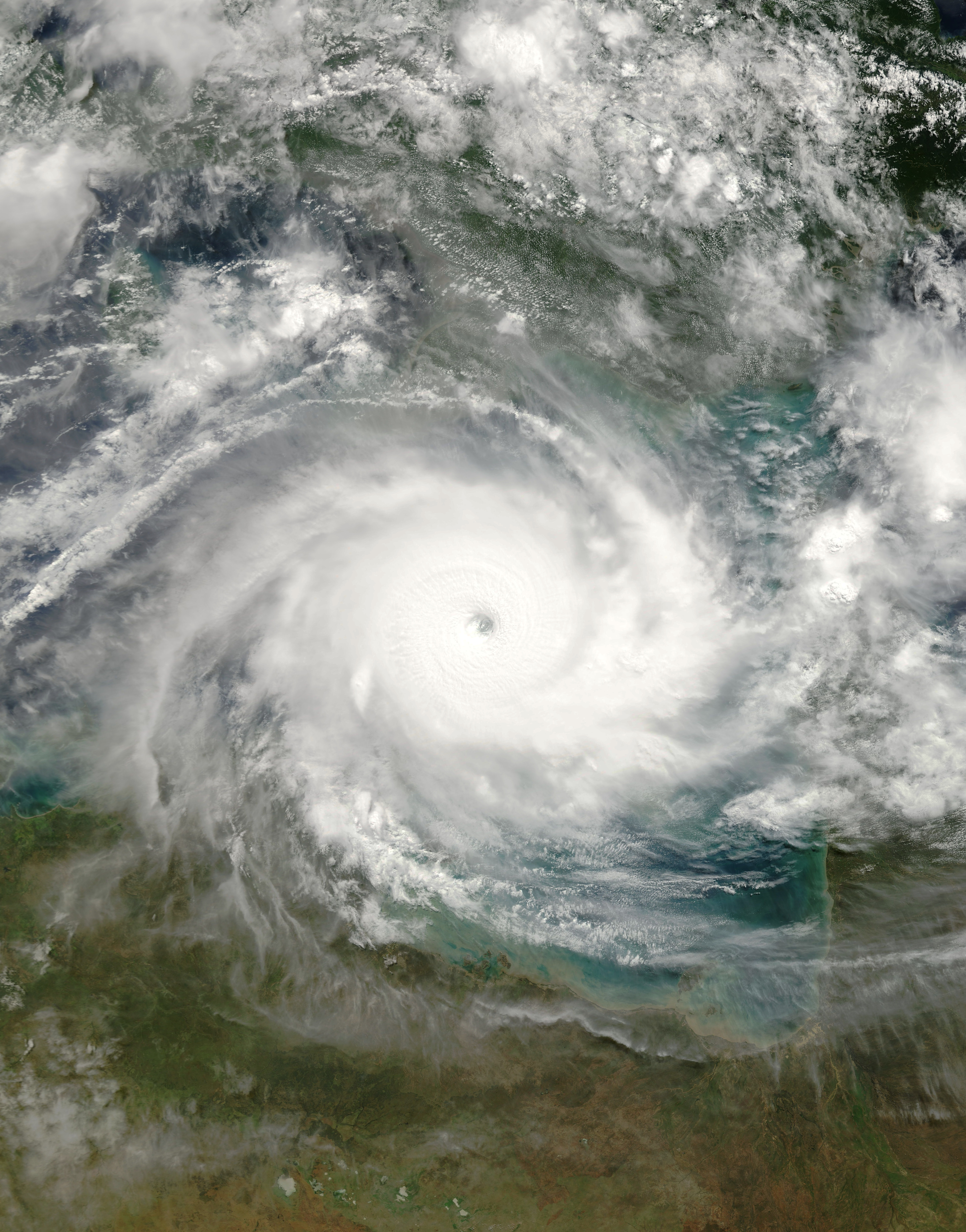
Cyclone Monica at peak intensity

The most intense tropical cyclone(s) in the Australian Region were cyclones Gwenda and Inigo. By 10-minute sustained wind speed, the strongest were Cyclone Orson, Cyclone Monica and Cyclone Marcus.

Storms with an intensity of 920 hPa (27.17 inHg) or less are listed. Storm information was less reliably documented and recorded before 1985.

Cyclone	Season	Peak classification	Peak 10-min sustained winds	Pressure
Mahina	1898–99	Unknown	Not specified	914 hPa (26.99 inHg) (Note: Unofficially estimated as 880 mbar, pending review.)
Joan	1975–76	Category 5 severe tropical cyclone	215 km/h (130 mph)	915 hPa (27.02 inHg)
Amy	1979–80	Category 5 severe tropical cyclone	215 km/h (130 mph)	915 hPa (27.02 inHg)
Kathy	1983–84	Category 5 severe tropical cyclone	205 km/h (125 mph)	916 hPa (27.05 inHg)
Orson	1988–89	Category 5 severe tropical cyclone	250 km/h (155 mph)	904 hPa (26.70 inHg)
Graham	1991–92	Category 5 severe tropical cyclone	205 km/h (125 mph)	915 hPa (27.02 inHg)
Rewa	1993–94	Category 5 severe tropical cyclone	205 km/h (125 mph)	920 hPa (27.17 inHg)
Theodore	1993–94	Category 5 severe tropical cyclone	205 km/h (125 mph)	910 hPa (26.87 inHg)
Chloe	1994–95	Category 5 severe tropical cyclone	220 km/h (140 mph)	920 hPa (27.17 inHg)
Pancho-Helinda	1996–97	Category 5 severe tropical cyclone	215 km/h (130 mph)	915 hPa (27.02 inHg)
Thelma	1998–99	Category 5 severe tropical cyclone	220 km/h (140 mph)	920 hPa (27.17 inHg)
Vance	1998–99	Category 5 severe tropical cyclone	215 km/h (130 mph)	910 hPa (26.87 inHg)
Frederic-Evrina	1998–99	Category 5 severe tropical cyclone	205 km/h (125 mph)	920 hPa (27.17 inHg)
Gwenda	1998–99	Category 5 severe tropical cyclone	220 km/h (140 mph)	900 hPa (26.58 inHg)
John	1999–2000	Category 5 severe tropical cyclone	205 km/h (125 mph)	915 hPa (27.02 inHg)
Paul	1999–2000	Category 5 severe tropical cyclone	220 km/h (140 mph)	915 hPa (27.02 inHg)
Chris	2001–02	Category 5 severe tropical cyclone	205 km/h (125 mph)	915 hPa (27.02 inHg)
Inigo	2002–03	Category 5 severe tropical cyclone	230 km/h (145 mph)	900 hPa (26.58 inHg)
Fay	2003–04	Category 5 severe tropical cyclone	215 km/h (130 mph)	910 hPa (26.87 inHg)
Floyd	2005–06	Category 4 severe tropical cyclone	195 km/h (120 mph)	916 hPa (27.05 inHg)
Glenda	2005–06	Category 5 severe tropical cyclone	205 km/h (125 mph)	910 hPa (26.87 inHg)
Monica	2005–06	Category 5 severe tropical cyclone	250 km/h (155 mph)	916 hPa (27.05 inHg)
George	2006–07	Category 5 severe tropical cyclone	205 km/h (125 mph)	902 hPa (26.64 inHg)
Marcus	2017–18	Category 5 severe tropical cyclone	250 km/h (155 mph)	905 hPa (26.72 inHg)
Darian	2022–23	Category 5 severe tropical cyclone	230 km/h (145 mph)	915 hPa (27.02 inHg)
Source: Database of past tropical cyclone tracks (BOM)

== South Pacific Ocean ==
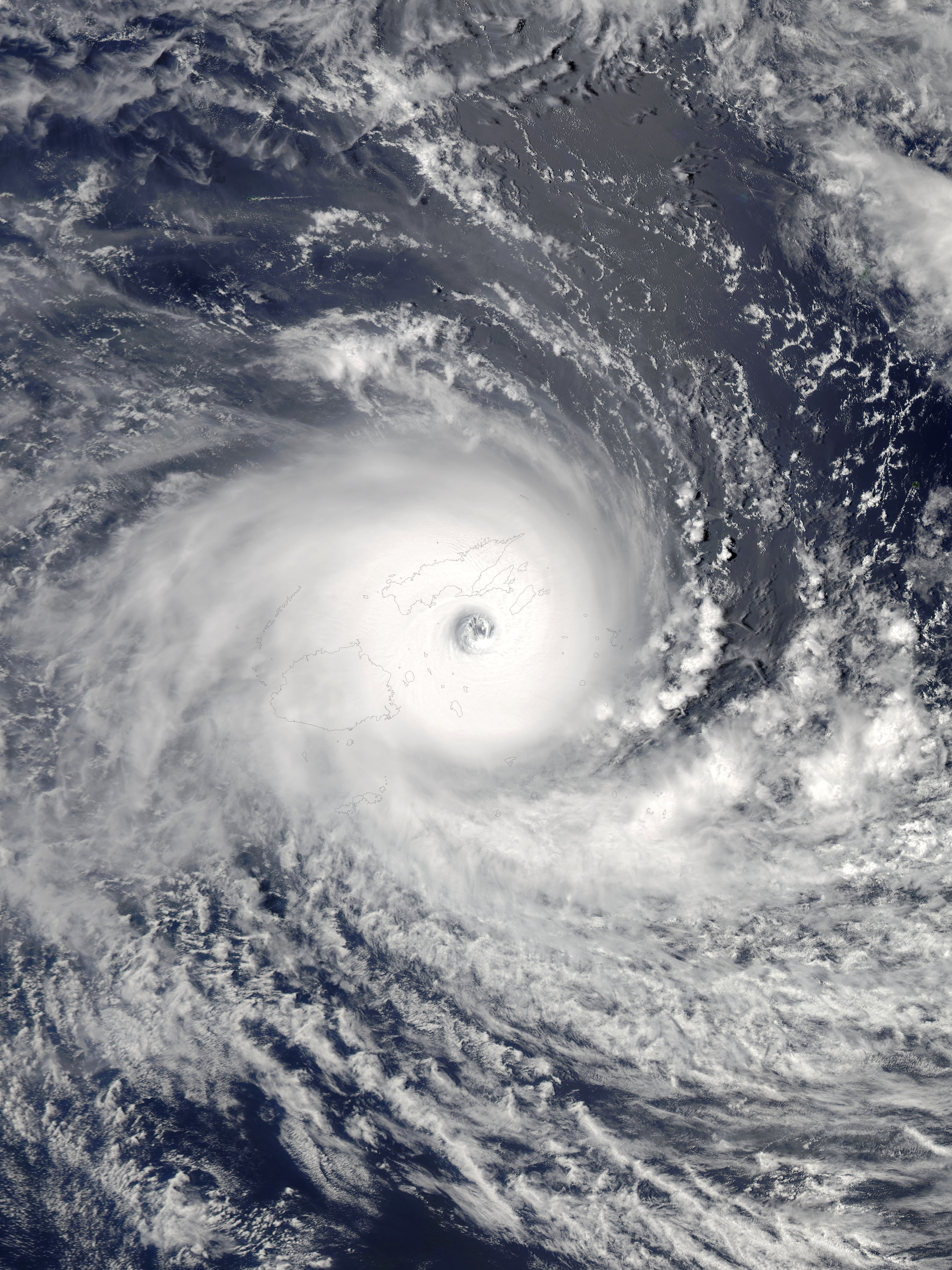
Cyclone Winston at peak intensity

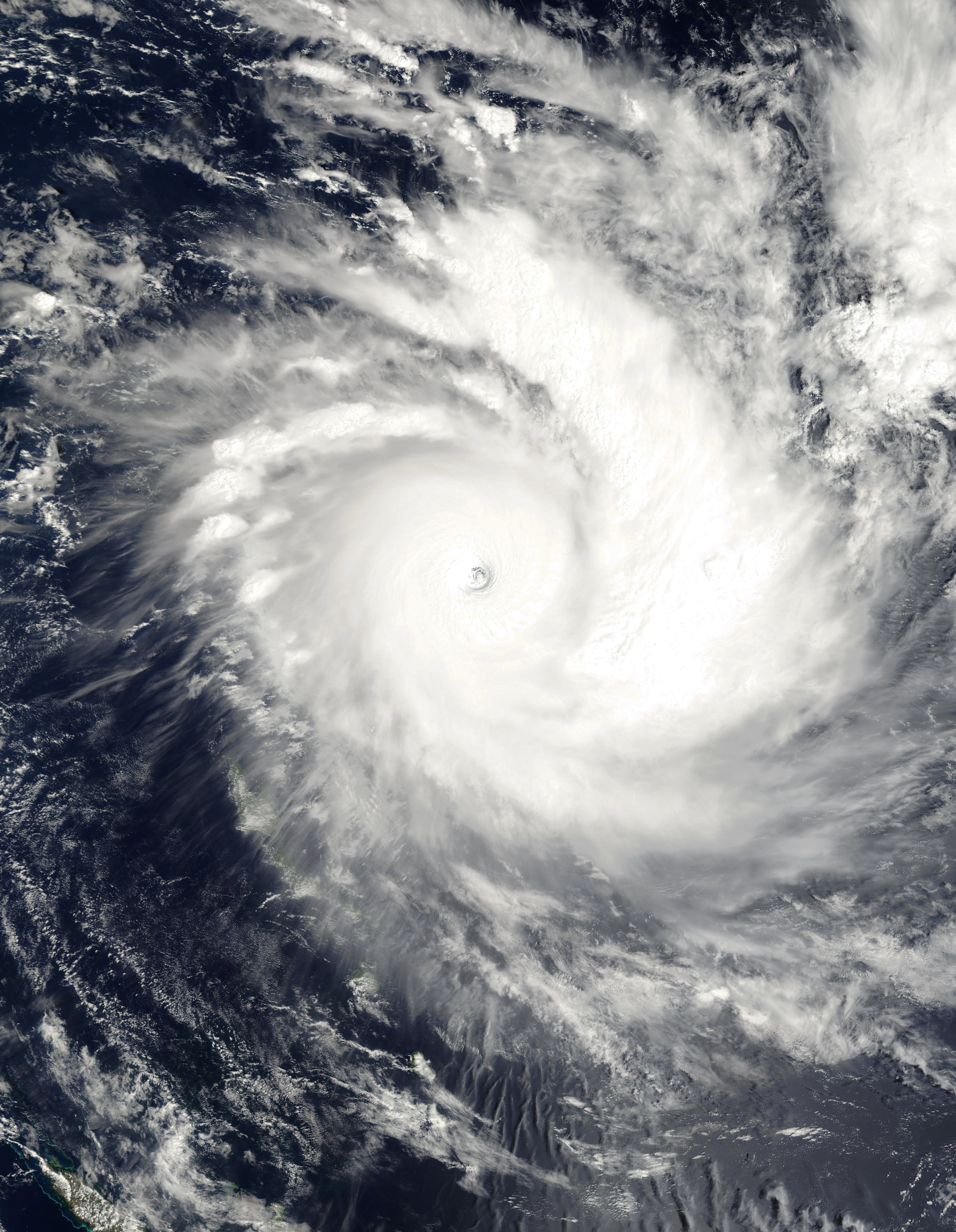
Cyclone Zoe at peak intensity and also the second most intense tropical cyclone in the Southern Hemisphere.

A total of 16 cyclones are listed down below reaching/surpassing an intensity of 920 hPa (27.17 inHg), with most of them occurring during El Niño seasons. Tropical cyclones that have been recorded since the start of the 1969–70 Tropical Cyclone year and have reached their peak intensity to the west of 160E are included in the list. The most intense tropical cyclone in the south Pacific, Cyclone Winston of 2016, is also the most intense storm in the Southern Hemisphere.

Storms with an intensity of 920 hPa (27.17 inHg) or less are listed.

Cyclone	Season	Peak classification	Peak 10-min sustained winds	Pressure
Oscar	1982–83	Category 4 severe tropical cyclone	185 km/h (115 mph)	920 hPa (27.17 inHg)
Hina	1984–85	Category 5 severe tropical cyclone	220 km/h (140 mph)	910 hPa (26.87 inHg)
Fran	1991–92	Category 5 severe tropical cyclone	205 km/h (125 mph)	920 hPa (27.17 inHg)
Ron	1997–98	Category 5 severe tropical cyclone	230 km/h (145 mph)	900 hPa (26.58 inHg)
Susan	1997–98	Category 5 severe tropical cyclone	230 km/h (145 mph)	900 hPa (26.58 inHg)
Beni	2002–03	Category 5 severe tropical cyclone	205 km/h (125 mph)	920 hPa (27.17 inHg)
Dovi	2002–03	Category 5 severe tropical cyclone	205 km/h (125 mph)	920 hPa (27.17 inHg)
Erica	2002–03	Category 5 severe tropical cyclone	215 km/h (130 mph)	915 hPa (27.02 inHg)
Zoe	2002–03	Category 5 severe tropical cyclone	240 km/h (150 mph)	890 hPa (26.28 inHg)
Heta	2003–04	Category 5 severe tropical cyclone	215 km/h (130 mph)	915 hPa (27.02 inHg)
Meena	2004–05	Category 5 severe tropical cyclone	215 km/h (130 mph)	915 hPa (27.02 inHg)
Olaf	2004–05	Category 5 severe tropical cyclone	215 km/h (130 mph)	915 hPa (27.02 inHg)
Percy	2004–05	Category 5 severe tropical cyclone	230 km/h (145 mph)	900 hPa (26.58 inHg)
Ului	2009–10	Category 5 severe tropical cyclone	215 km/h (130 mph)	915 hPa (27.02 inHg)
Pam	2014–15	Category 5 severe tropical cyclone	250 km/h (155 mph)	896 hPa (26.46 inHg)
Winston	2015–16	Category 5 severe tropical cyclone	280 km/h (175 mph)	884 hPa (26.10 inHg)
Harold	2019–20	Category 5 severe tropical cyclone	230 km/h (145 mph)	920 hPa (27.17 inHg)
Yasa	2020–21	Category 5 severe tropical cyclone	230 km/h (145 mph)	917 hPa (27.08 inHg)
Kevin	2022–23	Category 5 severe tropical cyclone	230 km/h (145 mph)	913 hPa (26.96 inHg)
Xavier	2026–27	Category 5 severe tropical cyclone	220 km/h (140 mph)	910 mbar (26.87 inHg)

== South Atlantic Ocean ==
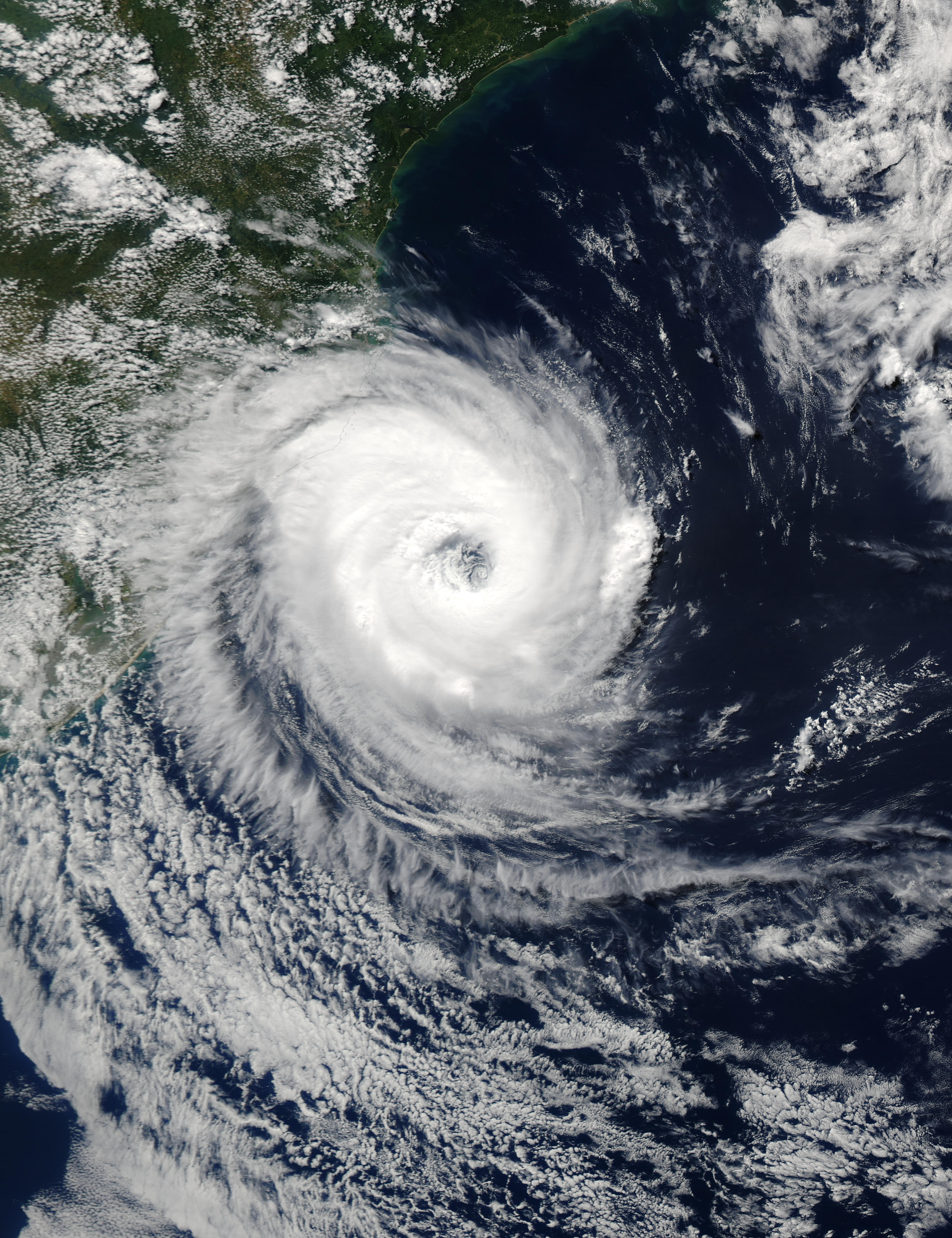
Hurricane Catarina near peak intensity

Until recently, it was not known that tropical cyclones could exist in the southern Atlantic. However, Hurricane Catarina in 2004, to date the only hurricane in the south Atlantic, brought additional review. A subsequent study found that there was an average of 1–2 subtropical or tropical cyclones per year in the Southern Atlantic in recent decades. No official database of South Atlantic cyclones exists, but a partial list of notable tropical and subtropical systems is listed.

Cyclone	Season	Peak classification	Peak 1-min sustained winds	Pressure
Unnamed	1991	Tropical storm	65 km/h (40 mph)	Unknown (Unknown)
Catarina	2004	Category 2 hurricane	155 km/h (100 mph)	972 hPa (28.70 inHg)
Anita	2010	Tropical storm	85 km/h (50 mph)	995 hPa (29.38 inHg)
Arani	2011	Subtropical storm	85 km/h (50 mph)	989 hPa (29.21 inHg)
Bapo	2015	Subtropical storm	65 km/h (40 mph)	992 hPa (29.29 inHg)
Cari	2015	Subtropical storm	65 km/h (40 mph)	998 hPa (29.47 inHg)
Deni	2016	Subtropical storm	75 km/h (45 mph)	998 hPa (29.47 inHg)
Eçaí	2016	Subtropical storm	100 km/h (65 mph)	992 hPa (29.29 inHg)
Guará	2017	Subtropical storm	75 km/h (45 mph)	996 hPa (29.41 inHg)
Iba	2019	Tropical storm	85 km/h (50 mph)	1,006 hPa (29.71 inHg)
Jaguar	2019	Subtropical storm	65 km/h (40 mph)	1,010 hPa (29.83 inHg)
Kurumí	2020	Subtropical storm	65 km/h (40 mph)	998 hPa (29.47 inHg)
Mani	2020	Subtropical storm	65 km/h (40 mph)	1,004 hPa (29.65 inHg)
Oquira	2020	Subtropical storm	65 km/h (40 mph)	998 hPa (29.47 inHg)
01Q	2021	Tropical storm	65 km/h (40 mph)	990 hPa (29.23 inHg)
Potira	2021	Subtropical storm	75 km/h (45 mph)	1,006 hPa (29.71 inHg)
Raoni	2021	Subtropical storm	95 km/h (60 mph)	986 hPa (29.12 inHg)
Ubá	2021	Subtropical storm	65 km/h (40 mph)	995 hPa (29.38 inHg)
Yakecan	2022	Subtropical storm	95 km/h (60 mph)	990 hPa (29.23 inHg)
Akará	2024	Tropical storm	85 km/h (50 mph)	994 hPa (29.35 inHg)
Biguá	2024	Subtropical storm	95 km/h (60 mph)	998 hPa (29.47 inHg)
Caiobá	2026	Subtropical storm	75 km/h (45 mph)	1,003 hPa (29.62 inHg)

== See also ==
- Atlantic hurricane season
- Australian region tropical cyclone
- List of the wettest tropical cyclones
- North Indian Ocean tropical cyclone
- Notable non-tropical pressures over the North Atlantic
- Pacific hurricane
- Pacific typhoon season
- South Atlantic tropical cyclone
- South Pacific tropical cyclone
- South-West Indian Ocean tropical cyclone
