= Typhoon June (1975) =

Pacific typhoon in 1975

Typhoon June (Rosing)
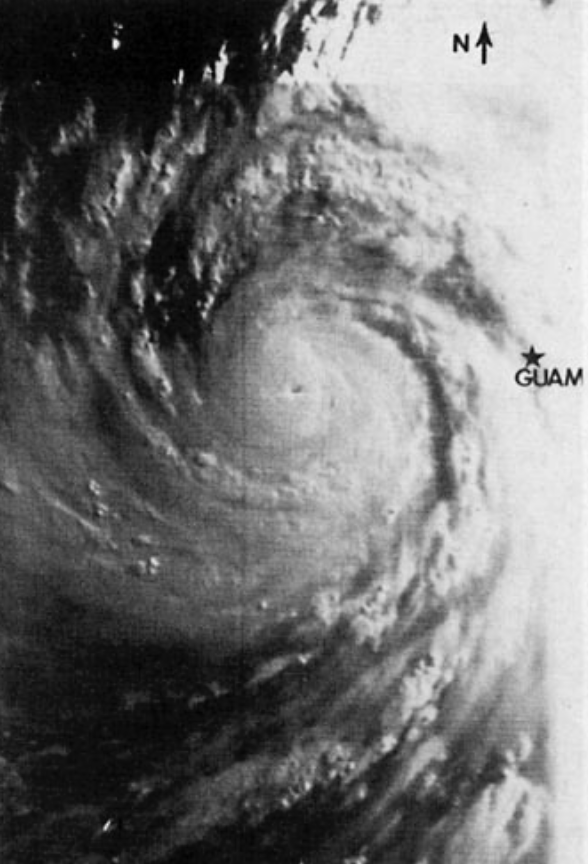
- June near peak intensity west of Guam on November 19

Meteorological history
- Formed: November 16, 1975
- Extratropical: November 24, 1975
- Dissipated: November 25, 1975

Violent typhoon
- 10-minute sustained (JMA)
- Lowest pressure: 875 hPa (mbar); 25.84 inHg (Tied for third-lowest worldwide)

Category 5-equivalent super typhoon
- 1-minute sustained (SSHWS/JTWC)
- Highest winds: 295 km/h (185 mph)
- Lowest pressure: 875 hPa (mbar); 25.84 inHg (Tied for third-lowest worldwide)

Overall effects
- Fatalities: None
- Damage: $1.3 million (1975 USD)
- Areas affected: Guam, Yap, Aleutian Islands, Siberia
- IBTrACS
- Part of the 1975 Pacific typhoon season

Typhoon June, known in the Philippines as Typhoon Rosing, was an extremely powerful tropical cyclone that is tied with Typhoon Nora in 1973 as the third-most intense tropical cyclone on record. The twenty-third named storm, fourteenth typhoon and third and final super typhoon of the 1975 Pacific typhoon season, June originated from a tropical disturbance moving westward over the Caroline Islands on November 14, organizing into a tropical depression two days later. The storm initially moved slowly due to weak steering forces from the system's close proximity to the equator, but began to move northwards on November 18. Simultaneously, June began to experience explosive intensification, with the central pressure falling by 90 mbar (2.7 inHg) in 24 hours. On November 19, a weather reconnaissance aircraft from the 54th Weather Reconnaissance Squadron of the United States Air Force measured a pressure of 875 mbar (25.8 inHg) at the edge of the eye. This made June the most intense tropical cyclone observed on record at the time, surpassing the pressure measured in Typhoon Ida in 1958 and tying it with Nora in 1973. Both have since been surpassed by 2015's Hurricane Patricia and 1979's Typhoon Tip. June continued to move northward through the Philippine Sea, weakening as it did so. The storm began accelerating into the westerlies before becoming extratropical on November 24. The remnants passed over the Aleutian Islands, before being last noted over Siberia, where it ultimately dissipated.

Despite the storm's extreme intensity, damage was relatively limited in Guam, and no casualties were caused by June, primarily as a result of staying west of the island chain, although storm surge was still a hazard that caused problems. June caused significant flooding and wind damage on Guam, some more localized then other areas, with total losses estimated at $1.3 million (1975 USD). At least 29 people were left homeless as a result. In Yap, the storm resulted in flood damage to property and crops on several atolls.

== Meteorological history ==
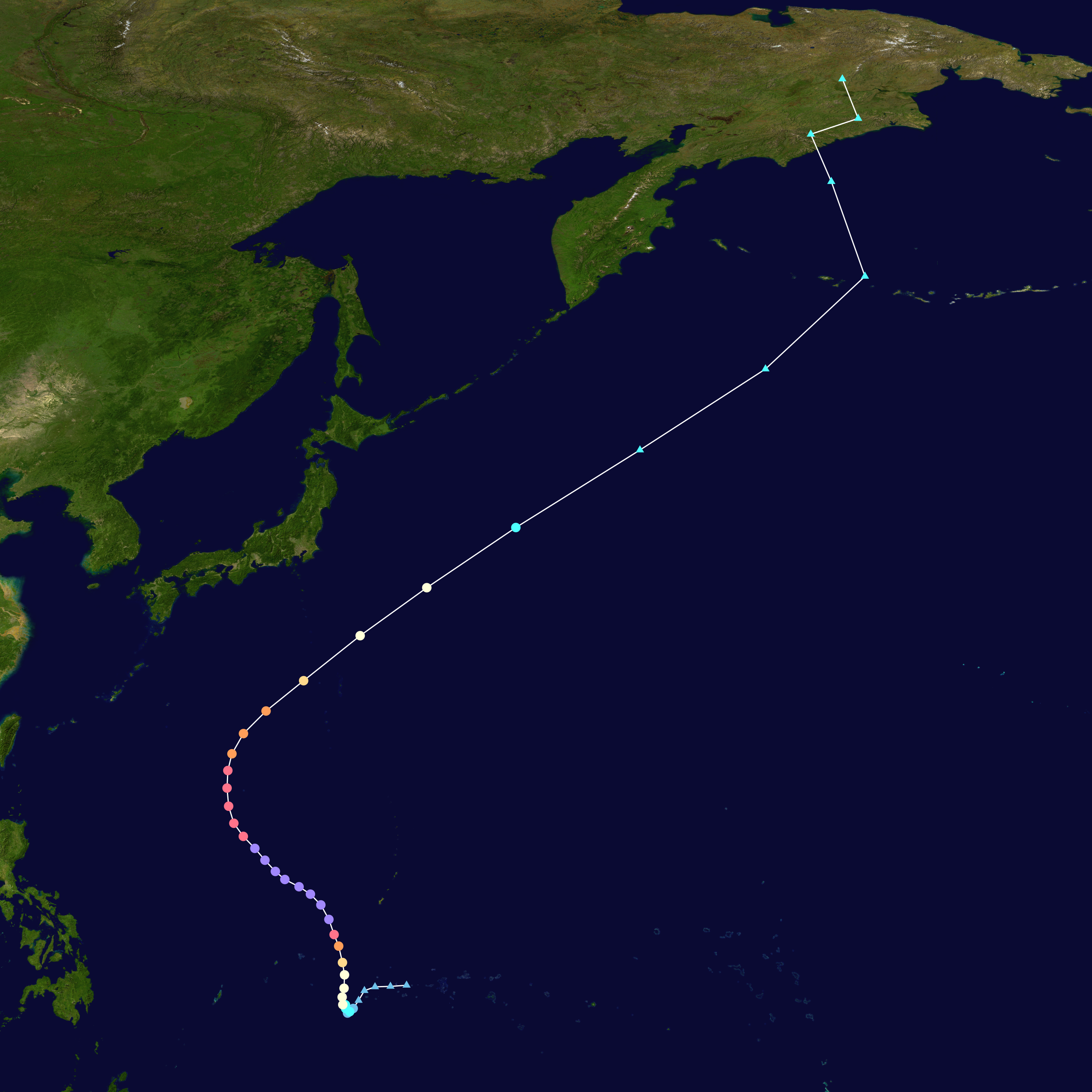
Map plotting the storm's track and intensity, according to the Saffir–Simpson scale Map key Saffir–Simpson scale Tropical depression (≤38 mph, ≤62 km/h) Tropical storm (39–73 mph, 63–118 km/h) Category 1 (74–95 mph, 119–153 km/h) Category 2 (96–110 mph, 154–177 km/h) Category 3 (111–129 mph, 178–208 km/h) Category 4 (130–156 mph, 209–251 km/h) Category 5 (≥157 mph, ≥252 km/h) Unknown Storm type Tropical cyclone Subtropical cyclone Extratropical cyclone, remnant low, tropical disturbance, or monsoon depression

June's origins can be traced back on November 14, when a tropical disturbance formed over the island of Micronesia. Located within very weak steering currents initially, the disturbance did not move much and meandered slowly westward, gradually before consolidating into a tropical depression at 06:00 UTC on November 16, about 445 nmi (824 km) south of Guam. A sprawling storm, satellite data suggested the cyclone intensified into a tropical storm shortly afterwards about six hours later, with the Joint Typhoon Warning Center (JTWC) assigning it the name June. The storm remained nearly quasi-stationary throughout the day on November 17 as it approached a weakness in a ridge to its north, strengthening at a steady pace, while being constantly surveyed by the Hurricane Hunters of the 54th Weather Reconnaissance Squadron. An approaching trough from the west began to steer June to the north the following day, at which point June then intensified into a typhoon.

Most intense tropical cyclones
	Cyclone	Season	Basin	Pressure	
	Cyclone	Season	Basin	hPa	inHg
1	Tip	1979	W. Pacific	870	25.7
2	Patricia	2015	E. Pacific	872	25.7
3	June	1975	W. Pacific	875	25.8
3	Nora	1973	W. Pacific	875	25.8
5	Forrest	1983	W. Pacific	876	25.9
6	Ida	1958	W. Pacific	877	25.9
7	Rita	1978	W. Pacific	878	26.0
8	Kit	1966	W. Pacific	880	26.0
8	Vanessa	1984	W. Pacific	880	26.0
10	Nancy	1961	W. Pacific	882	26.4
10	Wilma	2005	Atlantic	882	26.4
Source: JMA Typhoon Best Track Analysis. National Hurricane Center Tropical Cyclone Reports.

A small, 9 kilometres (5.6 mi)-wide eye developed, and, attributed to very favorable environmental conditions, June commenced a period of explosive intensification on November 18. The central pressure proceeded to drop 90 mb (2.7 inHg) in a day, with a 52 mb (1.5 inHg) drop recorded in only 11 hours, while the JTWC noted that the maximum sustained winds had increased to 295 km/h (185 mph), making it a Category 5-equivalent super typhoon on the Saffir–Simpson scale. Very early on November 19, at 08:13 UTC, a Hurricane Hunter aircraft within the eye of the extremely powerful typhoon measured a then-record low sea level pressure of 876 mb (25.9 inHg) via dropsonde. The sonde did not hit the center of the eye, so the lowest central pressure is assessed as having been slightly lower, at 875 mb (25.8 inHg), tying it with Nora in 1973 as the third-most intense tropical cyclone on record – with Hurricane Patricia of 2015 and Typhoon Tip in 1979 achieving lower pressures. Subsequent studies observed that as a result of the sonde missing the center, the true pressure of June might have been even lower than estimated. The Hurricane Hunters also observed frequent lightning within the eyewall, further signaling its extreme intensity. At the time of its peak, June was located about 200 nautical miles (370 km) west of Guam, its closest approach to the island.

After peaking, the small eye of June soon clouded over and filled, as an eyewall replacement cycle soon commenced later on November 19. The size of the powerful typhoon also increased as June towards more westward that night, with tropical storm-force winds extending out 250 nmi (460 km) from the center. During the eyewall cycle, June became the first instance from Hurricane Hunters to observe three concentric eyewalls in a tropical cyclone. June temporarily plateaued in intensity during the next day, before unfavorable conditions caused the typhoon to resume weakening, falling below Category 5-equivalent intensity on November 21. Accelerating north and then northeast into the westerlies at forward speeds up to 70 miles per hour (110 km/h), more pronounced weakening took place as June began losing tropical characteristics due to very strong wind shear. June became extratropical on November 22, and the JTWC issued their last advisory. The remnants of June then turned northwards, affecting the Aleutian Islands, and then far northeastern Siberia before it was last noted over that region on November 23.

== Preparations and impact ==
=== Guam ===
June never made a direct landfall and damage was relatively limited. However, June passed nearly 200 mi (320 km) west of Guam, which was enough to cause some preparations to be taken. Approximately 3,200 residents on the island were reported to have taken shelter in centers set up for evacuation purposes. At the Andersen Air Force Base, a peak wind gust of 80 miles per hour (130 km/h) was reported. Storm surge caused severe damage to portions of a highway between the villages of Merizo and Umatac. More severe and localized damage, the worst observed from the typhoon, was observed in Mangilao, where several homes were destroyed, and many others had roofs damaged or torn off. Power poles and cars were among the things that were reported to be damaged. 29 people were reported to have ended up homeless as a result of June's impacts. Total damages were reported to be $1.3 million, with damages to crops account for 38% of the total damage. No deaths occurred as a result of June.

=== Yap ===
On the island of Yap, severe damage was reported in Eauripik Atoll, with descriptions of "a sizable portion" of the island being washed away by storm surge. Property damage and crop damage was also observed on the island as well. Multiple other low-lying atolls or islands in Yap also reported similar results. As with the island of Guam, no deaths occurred in Yap.

== Records and distinctions ==
Measurements from aircraft belonging to the 54th Weather Reconnaissance Squadron of the United States Air Force measured a central pressure of 876 mbar (25.9 inHg) at the edge of the eye. This made June the most intense tropical cyclone ever observed on record at the time, surpassing the pressures measured in Typhoon Ida in 1958 and Typhoon Nora in 1973, until the record was surpassed by Typhoon Tip in 1979 with a minimum central pressure of 870 hPa, and Hurricane Patricia in 2015 with a minimum central pressure of 872 hPa, making June the third most intense tropical cyclone recorded.

== See also ==
- Pacific typhoon season
- List of the most intense tropical cyclones
- Other storms named June
- Other storms named Rosing
