= Typhoon Kit (1966) =

Pacific typhoon in 1966

Typhoon Kit (Emang)
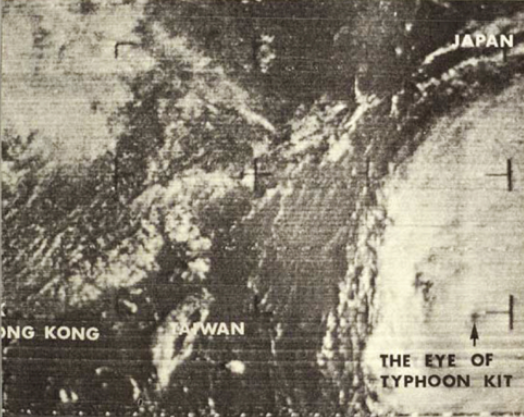
- Satellite image of Typhoon Kit

Meteorological history
- Formed: June 20, 1966
- Dissipated: June 29, 1966

Violent typhoon
- 10-minute sustained (JMA)
- Lowest pressure: 880 hPa (mbar); 25.99 inHg (Tied for eighth lowest worldwide)

Category 5-equivalent super typhoon
- 1-minute sustained (SSHWS/JTWC)
- Highest winds: 315 km/h (195 mph)
- Lowest pressure: 914 hPa (mbar); 26.99 inHg

Overall effects
- Fatalities: 64
- Missing: 19
- Areas affected: Japan
- Part of the 1966 Pacific typhoon season

Typhoon Kit, known in the Philippines as Super Typhoon Emang, was one of the most intense tropical cyclones on record, and is tied for the seventh-most intense typhoon in the Western Pacific basin. Kit was the fifth tropical depression, fourth typhoon, and the first super typhoon of the 1966 Pacific typhoon season.

== Meteorological history ==
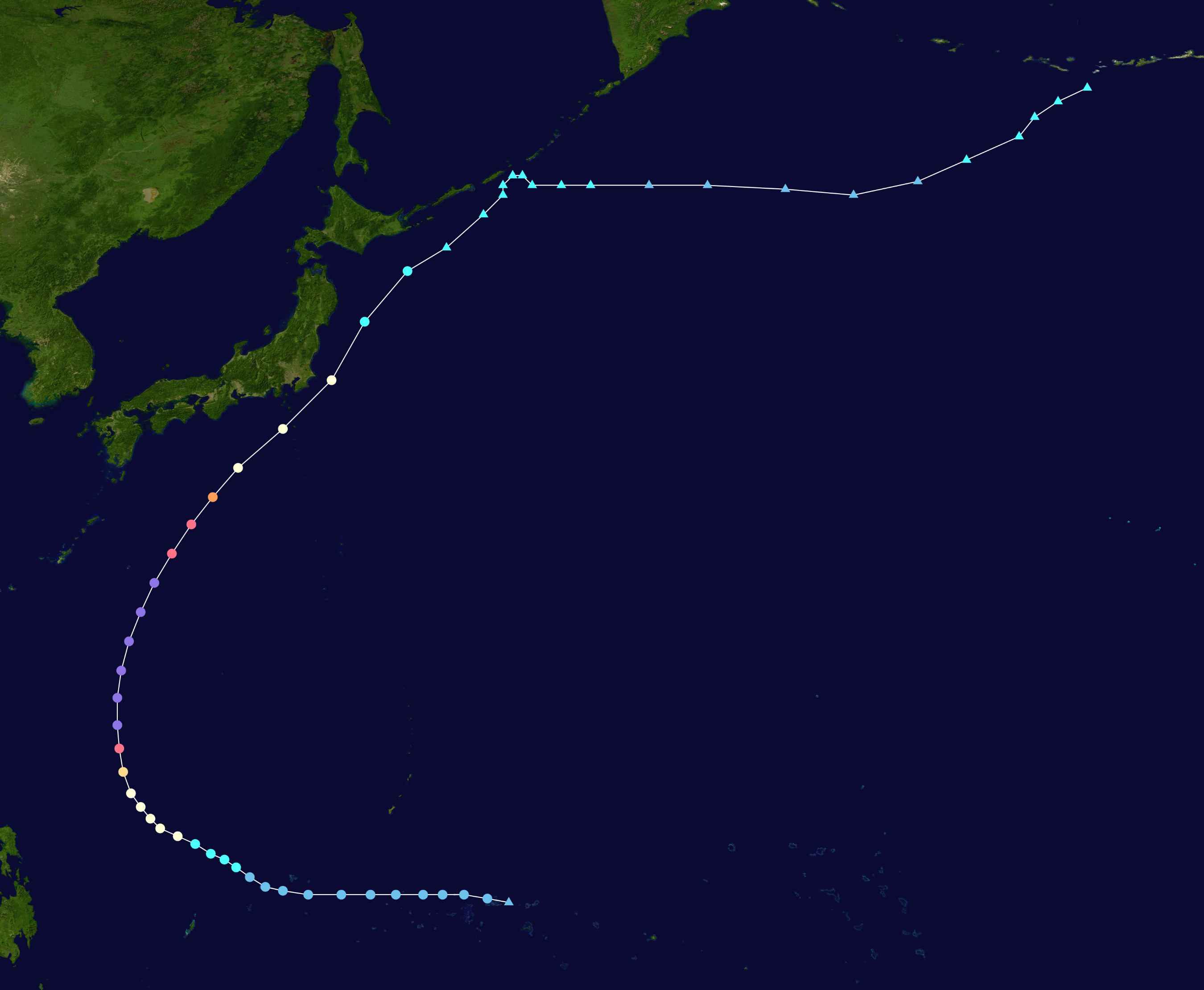
Map plotting the storm's track and intensity, according to the Saffir–Simpson scale Map key Saffir–Simpson scale Tropical depression (≤38 mph, ≤62 km/h) Tropical storm (39–73 mph, 63–118 km/h) Category 1 (74–95 mph, 119–153 km/h) Category 2 (96–110 mph, 154–177 km/h) Category 3 (111–129 mph, 178–208 km/h) Category 4 (130–156 mph, 209–251 km/h) Category 5 (≥157 mph, ≥252 km/h) Unknown Storm type Tropical cyclone Subtropical cyclone Extratropical cyclone, remnant low, tropical disturbance, or monsoon depression

The incipient disturbance that became Super Typhoon Kit was first identified on June 20 near Chuuk State in the Federated States of Micronesia. The JMA designated that system as a tropical depression that day as the system moved steadily westward. The JTWC followed suit with this classification on June 22 following an investigation by reconnaissance. Early the next day, the depression acquired gale-force winds and was dubbed Tropical Storm Kit. Turning to the northwest, Kit developed a 35–55 km (22–34 mi) wide eye and reached typhoon status late on June 23. Explosive intensification ensued late on June 24 into June 25; Kit's central pressure dropped 51 mbar (hPa; 1.51 inHg) in 18 hours from 965 mbar (hPa; 28.50 inHg) to 914 mbar (hPa; 26.99 inHg). During this time, Kit's eye contracted to 13 to 17 km (8.1 to 10.6 mi).

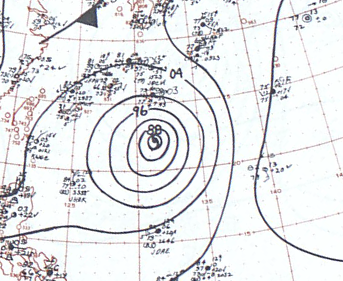
Typhoon Kit June 26, 1966 surface analysis

At 06:00 UTC on June 26, the JMA estimated Kit's pressure to have abruptly dropped to 880 mbar (hPa; 25.99 inHg), which would rank it among the top ten most intense tropical cyclones on record. Around this time, the JTWC estimated Kit to have attained peak winds of 315 km/h (196 mph); however, these winds are likely an overestimate. A later reconnaissance mission on June 26 reported a pressure of 912 mbar (hPa; 26.93 inHg), the lowest observed in relation to the typhoon. Weakening ensued thereafter as the system accelerated to the north-northeast. Retaining typhoon strength, Kit brushed southeastern Honshu, Japan, on June 28, passing roughly 155 km (96 mi) east of Tokyo. The system subsequently weakened to a tropical storm and transitioned into an extratropical cyclone south of Hokkaido on June 29. The National Oceanic and Atmospheric Administration reported the remnants of Kit to have dissipated the following day near northeastern Hokkaido. However, the JMA states that the system turned eastward and accelerated over the north Pacific before losing its identity on July 3 near the International Dateline.

== Impact ==
Most intense Pacific typhoons
| | Typhoon | Season | Pressure | |
| | Typhoon | Season | hPa | inHg |
|---|---|---|---|---|
| 1 | Tip | 1979 | 870 | 25.7 |
| 2 | June | 1975 | 875 | 25.8 |
| 2 | Nora | 1973 | 875 | 25.8 |
| 4 | Forrest | 1983 | 876 | 25.9 |
| 5 | Ida | 1958 | 877 | 25.9 |
| 6 | Rita | 1978 | 878 | 26.0 |
| 7 | Kit | 1966 | 880 | 26.0 |
| 7 | Vanessa | 1984 | 880 | 26.0 |
| 9 | Nancy | 1961 | 882 | 26.4 |
| 10 | Irma | 1971 | 884 | 26.1 |
Source: JMA Typhoon Best Track Analysis Information for the North Western Pacific Ocean.

Although the center of Kit remained offshore, torrential rains and damaging winds wreaked havoc in eastern Japan. An estimated 510 to 760 mm (20 to 30 in) of rain fell across the region, triggering deadly landslides and floods. More than 128,000 homes were affected by flooding, of which 433 collapsed. Large stretches of roadway crumbled or were blocked by landslides. Additionally, service along the 480 km (300 mi) Tokyo–Osaka rail line was disrupted for 12 hours. "Hip-deep" waters also shut down Tokyo's subway system, stranding an estimated 2 million people. Throughout the country, 64 people lost their lives while a further 19 were listed missing. In the aftermath of the typhoon, 25 workers died from carbon monoxide poisoning from a portable generator while repairing a damaged irrigation tunnel near Utsunomiya.
