= Typhoon Vanessa =

Pacific typhoon in 1984

Typhoon Vanessa (Toyang)
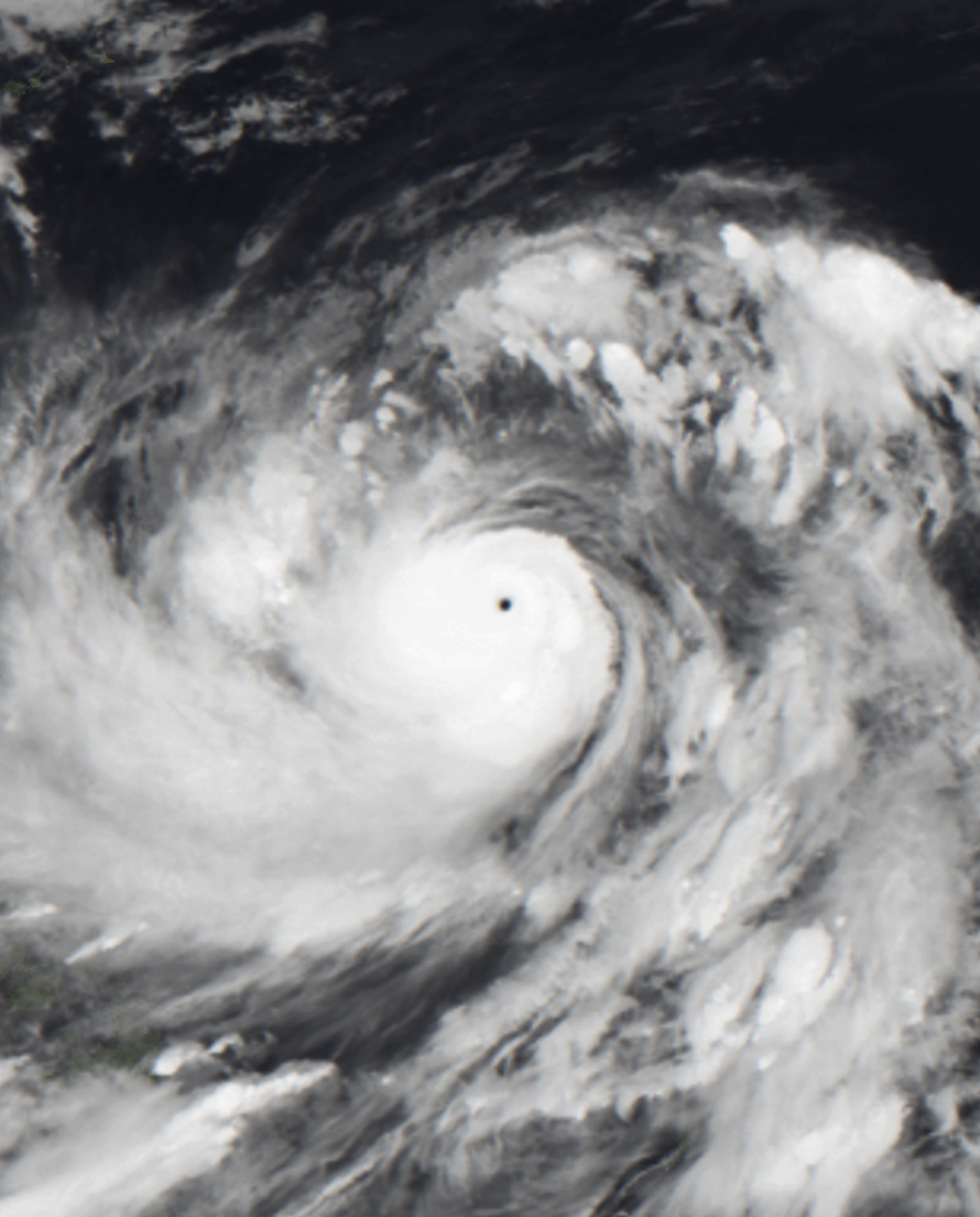
- Vanessa at peak intensity on October 26

Meteorological history
- Formed: October 22, 1984
- Extratropical: October 30, 1984
- Dissipated: October 30, 1984

Violent typhoon
- 10-minute sustained (JMA)
- Highest winds: 220 km/h (140 mph)
- Lowest pressure: 880 hPa (mbar); 25.99 inHg (Tied for eighth lowest worldwide)

Category 5-equivalent super typhoon
- 1-minute sustained (SSHWS/JTWC)
- Highest winds: 285 km/h (180 mph)
- Lowest pressure: 879 hPa (mbar); 25.96 inHg

Overall effects
- Fatalities: 63 total
- Damage: $1.7 million (1984 USD)
- Areas affected: Caroline Islands; Mariana Islands; Philippines
- Part of the 1984 Pacific typhoon season

Typhoon Vanessa, known in the Philippines as Typhoon Toyang, was the strongest tropical cyclone of the 1984 Pacific typhoon season and one of the most intense tropical cyclones on record. It was the twenty-second named storm, twelfth typhoon, and first super typhoon of the 1984 season.

== Meteorological history ==
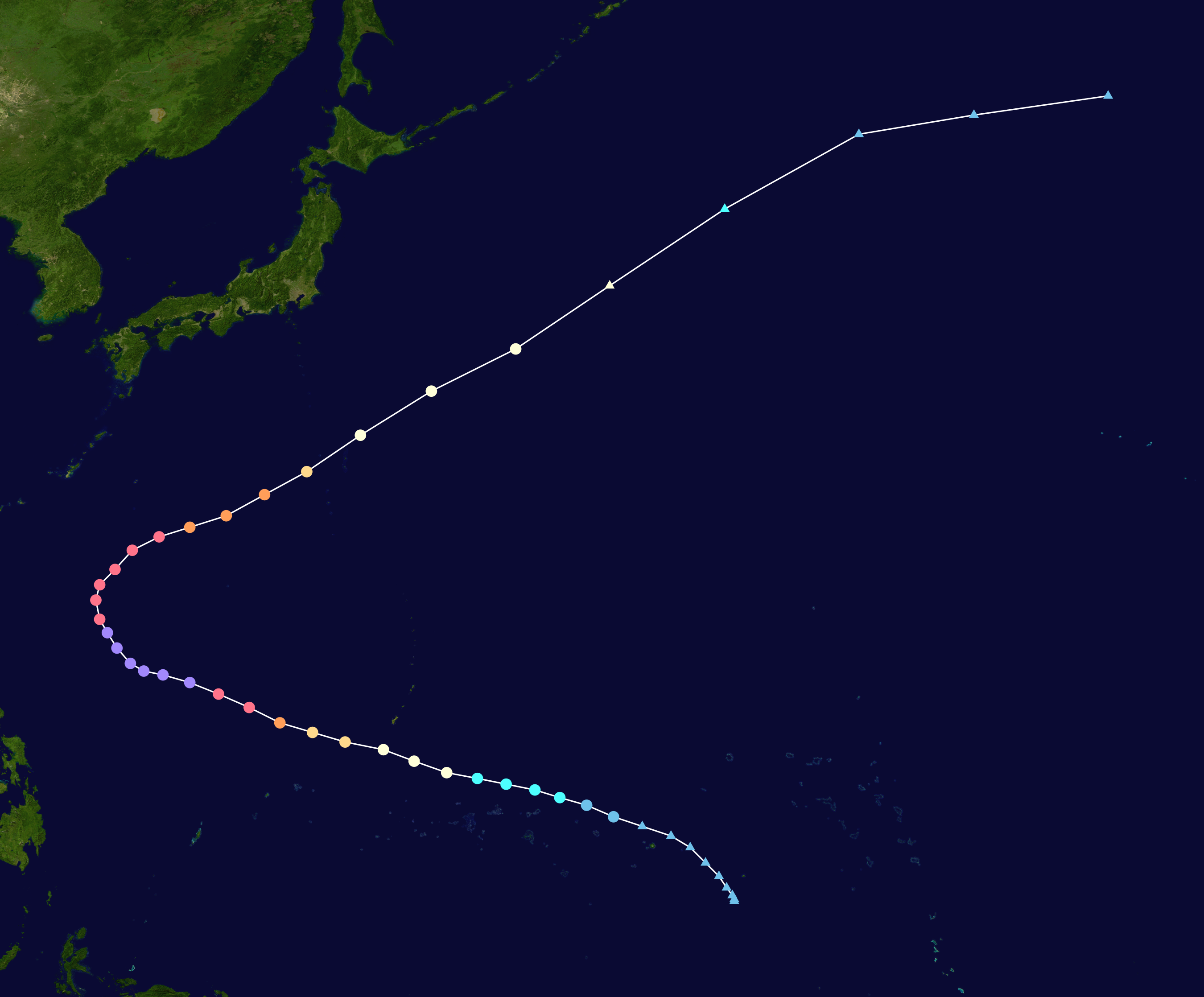
Map plotting the storm's track and intensity, according to the Saffir–Simpson scale Map key Saffir–Simpson scale Tropical depression (≤38 mph, ≤62 km/h) Tropical storm (39–73 mph, 63–118 km/h) Category 1 (74–95 mph, 119–153 km/h) Category 2 (96–110 mph, 154–177 km/h) Category 3 (111–129 mph, 178–208 km/h) Category 4 (130–156 mph, 209–251 km/h) Category 5 (≥157 mph, ≥252 km/h) Unknown Storm type Tropical cyclone Subtropical cyclone Extratropical cyclone, remnant low, tropical disturbance, or monsoon depression

A low pressure area developed from a near equatorial trough southeast of Ponape on October 20, moving northwest until being well north of the island as it slowly developed. The disturbance strengthened into a tropical depression on October 22 and a tropical storm ( receiving the name Vanessa ) on October 23. The next day, Vanessa strengthened into a minimal typhoon.

Moving west-northwest, Vanessa began to explosively intensify on October 25, becoming a super typhoon two days later. Super Typhoon Vanessa continued to intensify throughout the day, reaching its peak intensity with maximum sustained wind speeds of 180 miles per hour (290 km/h) well west of the Philippines. At its peak, it had a pressure of 880 mb, which makes it tied as the seventh most intense tropical cyclone on record, behind Ida of 1958 and only 10 millibars higher than the record-setting Typhoon Tip of 1979. Vanessa's central pressure had fallen at a near-record pace of 100 mb in 48 hours. The intense cyclone recurved to the northeast on October 27 and 28 as a cold front approached from the northwest. Vanessa slowly weakened and began to merge with the frontal boundary, becoming a storm-force extratropical cyclone late on October 30 before being absorbed by the front later that day.

== Impact ==
Most intense tropical cyclones
	Cyclone	Season	Basin	Pressure	
	Cyclone	Season	Basin	hPa	inHg
1	Tip	1979	W. Pacific	870	25.7
2	Patricia	2015	E. Pacific	872	25.7
3	June	1975	W. Pacific	875	25.8
3	Nora	1973	W. Pacific	875	25.8
5	Forrest	1983	W. Pacific	876	25.9
6	Ida	1958	W. Pacific	877	25.9
7	Rita	1978	W. Pacific	878	26.0
8	Kit	1966	W. Pacific	880	26.0
8	Vanessa	1984	W. Pacific	880	26.0
10	Nancy	1961	W. Pacific	882	26.4
10	Wilma	2005	Atlantic	882	26.4
Source: JMA Typhoon Best Track Analysis. National Hurricane Center Tropical Cyclone Reports.

As a minimal typhoon, Vanessa moved about 165 kilometres (103 mi) south of Guam, where winds gusted to 59 knots (109 km/h) on Nimitz Hill. Damage on the island totaled US$1.7 million (1984 dollars, US$4.98 million in 2023), mainly to the banana crop.

Though the storm did not directly impact the Philippines, its outer bands triggered flooding that killed 63 people.
