= Typhoon Forrest =

Pacific typhoon in 1983

Typhoon Forrest (Ising)
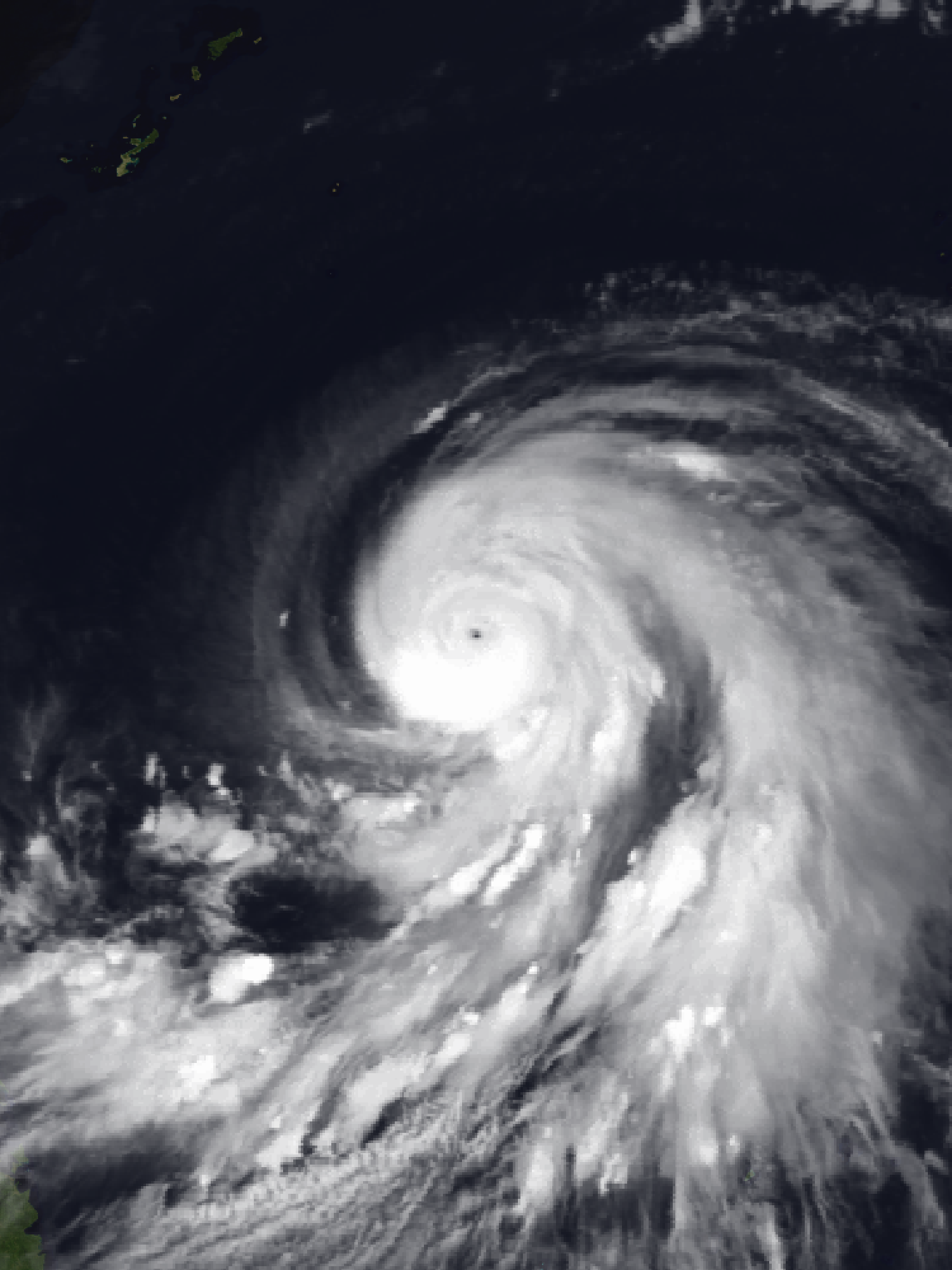
- Typhoon Forrest at peak intensity on September 23

Meteorological history
- Formed: September 19, 1983
- Extratropical: September 28, 1983
- Dissipated: October 4, 1983

Violent typhoon
- 10-minute sustained (JMA)
- Highest winds: 205 km/h (125 mph)
- Lowest pressure: 885 hPa (mbar); 26.13 inHg

Category 5-equivalent super typhoon
- 1-minute sustained (SSHWS/JTWC)
- Highest winds: 280 km/h (175 mph)
- Lowest pressure: 876 hPa (mbar); 25.87 inHg (Fifth-lowest worldwide)

Overall effects
- Fatalities: 21
- Missing: 17
- Damage: $339 million (1983 USD)
- Areas affected: Guam; Japan
- IBTrACS
- Part of the 1983 Pacific typhoon season

Typhoon Forrest, known as Typhoon Ising by PAGASA, was the fifth-most intense tropical cyclone on record and the fastest-deepening tropical cyclone worldwide. Its minimum barometric pressure dropped 100 mbar (3.0 inHg) from September 22 to September 23, in less than a day. Forrest formed from a tropical disturbance far from land in the western Pacific Ocean. On September 20, the system was classified as a tropical storm, and thereafter began to intensify. The next day, Forrest reached typhoon status, and the intensification process accelerated. The storm prudently strengthened on September 22, and the following morning, attained peak intensity following a pressure drop of 100 mbar (3.0 inHg) in slightly less than 24 hours. Thereafter, Forrest began to weaken slowly as it moved northwest. Approaching Japan, Super Typhoon Forrest first hit Okinawa on September 27. Nearby, a tornado hit Inza Island, destroying 26 homes and injuring 26 people. Forrest then moved north, striking the Japanese archipelago before transitioning into an extratropical cyclone on September 28, before eventually dissipating on October 4 out at sea.

The torrential rainfall caused by the typhoon triggered deadly landslides and flooding across Japan. In all, the typhoon killed at least 21 people, left 17 listed as missing, and injured 86. Forrest flooded 46,000 homes in muddy water, over 100 dwellings were destroyed, and 2,560 people were rendered as homeless. Seven flights were called off and 27,000 people were stranded. In addition, 67 bridges and 818 roads were damaged. Total damages were estimated to be at US$339 million.

== Meteorological history ==
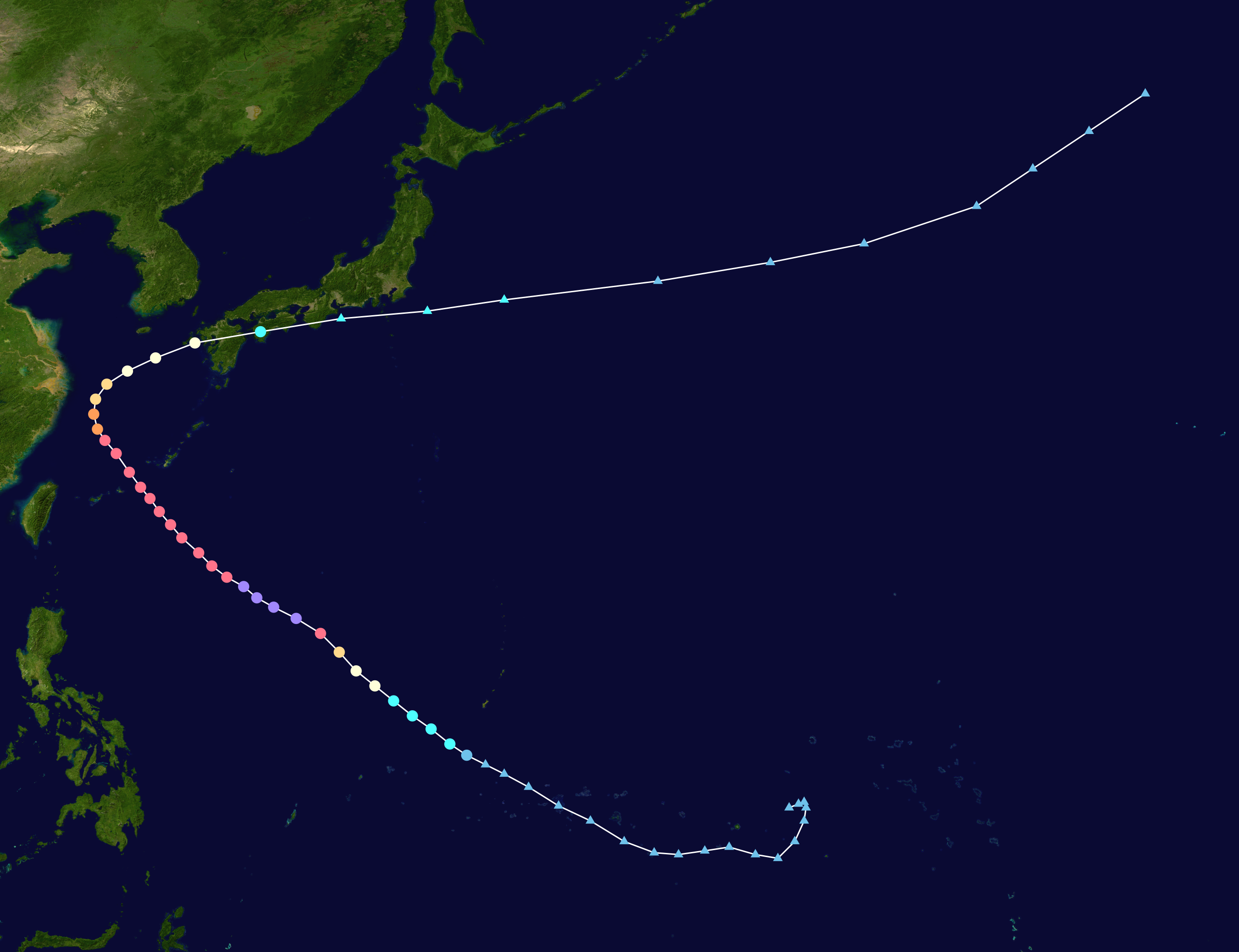
Map plotting the storm's track and intensity, according to the Saffir–Simpson scale Map key Saffir–Simpson scale Tropical depression (≤38 mph, ≤62 km/h) Tropical storm (39–73 mph, 63–118 km/h) Category 1 (74–95 mph, 119–153 km/h) Category 2 (96–110 mph, 154–177 km/h) Category 3 (111–129 mph, 178–208 km/h) Category 4 (130–156 mph, 209–251 km/h) Category 5 (≥157 mph, ≥252 km/h) Unknown Storm type Tropical cyclone Subtropical cyclone Extratropical cyclone, remnant low, tropical disturbance, or monsoon depression

Typhoon Forrest originated from an area of disturbed weather that was first noted by the Joint Typhoon Warning Center (JTWC) around 555 km (345 mi) west of Pohnpei in mid-September. Initially, the system was not well-organized; however, it had a sufficient amount of convection. Hurricane hunters investigated the system four times from September 17–20, though none of them were able to identify a closed atmospheric circulation. Despite this, a Tropical Cyclone Formation Alert (TCFA) was issued on September 18. This alert was issued again on September 19; meanwhile, the Japan Meteorological Agency (JMA) started to monitor the system. By early on September 20, the JMA upgraded the system into a tropical storm as it moved west-northwest. (Note: The Japan Meteorological Agency is the official Regional Specialized Meteorological Center for the western Pacific Ocean.) During the evening hours of September 20, the JTWC started issuing warnings on the system after the low developed a central dense overcast. At this time, the storm was located about 330 km (205 mi) south of Guam. Initially, only gradually strengthening was expected by the JTWC, but this did not occur and by the morning hours of September 21, Hurricane Hunters measured winds of 95 to 115 km/h (60 to 70 mph). Based on this, the JTWC classified the system as a tropical storm and named it Forrest. Around this time, JMA upgraded Forrest into a severe tropical storm.

Most intense tropical cyclones
| | Cyclone | Season | Basin | Pressure | |
| | Cyclone | Season | Basin | hPa | inHg |
|---|---|---|---|---|---|
| 1 | Tip | 1979 | W. Pacific | 870 | 25.7 |
| 2 | Patricia | 2015 | E. Pacific | 872 | 25.7 |
| 3 | June | 1975 | W. Pacific | 875 | 25.8 |
| 3 | Nora | 1973 | W. Pacific | 875 | 25.8 |
| 5 | Forrest | 1983 | W. Pacific | 876 | 25.9 |
| 6 | Ida | 1958 | W. Pacific | 877 | 25.9 |
| 7 | Rita | 1978 | W. Pacific | 878 | 26.0 |
| 8 | Kit | 1966 | W. Pacific | 880 | 26.0 |
| 8 | Vanessa | 1984 | W. Pacific | 880 | 26.0 |
| 10 | Nancy | 1961 | W. Pacific | 882 | 26.4 |
| 10 | Wilma | 2005 | Atlantic | 882 | 26.4 |
Source: JMA Typhoon Best Track Analysis. National Hurricane Center Tropical Cyclone Reports.

By 1800 UTC that day, both the JTWC and the JMA upgraded Forrest to typhoon status as the storm developed an eye. After moving away from Guam, Forrest continued deepening; by the evening hours of September 21, Hurricane Hunter data indicated a minimum barometric pressure of 976 mbar (28.8 inHg). Explosive intensification ensued, however, and a mere 11 hours later, the aircraft reported a pressure of 926 mbar (27.3 inHg), which prompted the JTWC to increase the intensity of the cyclone to 225 km/h (140 mph). At 18:00 UTC on September 22, the JTWC assessed the peak intensity of the storm at 280 km/h (175 mph), equivalent to a Category 5 hurricane on the Saffir-Simpson Hurricane Wind Scale. Just under three hours later, a Hurricane Hunter aircraft investigated the typhoon and based on extrapolation from heights measured at 700 mbar (21 inHg), reported a sea level pressure of 876 mbar (25.9 inHg), the fifth-lowest pressure worldwide. This marked the end of the fastest pressure drop ever recorded by a tropical cyclone—100 mb (3.0 inHg) in just under 24 hours. By this time, the temperature within the eye, as recorded by Hurricane Hunter aircraft, had reached 27 °C (80 °F). After a brief turn towards the west-northwest, the JMA reported that Forrest attained its peak intensity at 0000 UTC on September 23, with 10-minute sustained winds of 205 km/h (125 mph) and a minimum central pressure of 885 mbar (26.1 inHg), despite being higher than what Hurricane Hunters measured.

After attaining peak intensity, the storm weakened slightly on September 24 according to the JMA, though the storm briefly restrengthened to its peak wind speed at noon on September 25. By this time, Forrest was moving northwest, and the JTWC expected the storm to re-curve due to a weak spot in the subtropical ridge. However, the re-curvature took longer than expected. The JMA suggested that the storm maintained its intensity of 200 km/h (125 mph) for several days. On September 27, however, the JMA estimated that Forrest finally began to weaken. The storm quickly weakened thereafter, and by midday, the JMA downgraded the system into a severe tropical storm. During September 28, the system completed its extratropical transition, with the JTWC issuing their final advisory on the system early on the next day. After becoming an extratropical cyclone the system recurved and started to accelerate towards the east-northeast, before the JMA stopped monitoring the system during September 30, as it moved into the East Pacific basin. Thereafter, several ships reported storm and gale force winds while the system moved towards the east-northeast as it approached southwest Alaska. The system subsequently stalled and gradually dissipated over the open waters of the Gulf of Alaska, with the system being last identifiable on October 4, about 1,415 km (880 mi) northwest of Vancouver.

== Preparations and impact ==
=== Guam ===
During its formative stages, the storm passed near Guam, where winds of 32 km/h (20 mph) were measured. Rainfall was light, totaling 51 mm (2.0 in), but was enough to result in slight flooding.

=== Japan ===
While weakening and passing 200 km (125 mi) southwest of Okinawa, gusty winds and heavy rains were recorded. At the Kadena Air Base, winds of 95 km/h (59 mph) and gusts of 80 mph (130 km/h) were measured. Rainfall of 296 mm (11.7 in) was recorded, resulting in minor flooding. A few people were hurt due to high winds, but according to the JTWC, the residents of Okinwana weathered the storm "well". Numerous funnel clouds were spotted, but no tornadoes were recorded. Northwest of Okinwana, on Inaka Island, a tornado was reported, which cleared a 91 m (299 ft) wide swath. Throughout the island of Okinawa, 30 sustained minor injuries and 20 homes would either damaged or destroyed, including seven homes that were destroyed. About 160,000 customers lost power.

When the storm posed a threat to Kyushu, five ships were evacuated to an air force base that was considered "safe typhoon haven" by the JTWC. In Motoyama, 540 mm (21 in) of rain fell, including 415 mm (16.3 in) in 24 hours and 102 mm (4.0 in) in one hour. In Nagoya, five children were washed away by rising floodwaters while they were walking home from school. Four of the children were confirmed dead, and one 5-year-old child was reported missing. In Nishinomiya, near the western city of Kyoto, twelve construction workers were swept away by a downpour-triggered mudslide. Four of the construction workers were rescued, but the remaining eight of the construction workers were missing. Elsewhere in the city, a landslide destroyed two homes, resulting in the deaths of a 71-year-old and a 77-year-old farmer. Around 60 mi (95 km) south of Tokyo, in Shizuoka, three construction workers were swept along the Nishi River. In Hyogo, on Honshu, 12 people were buried alive when a hut collapsed due to a mudslide.

In all, Forrest killed at least 21 people, left 17 missing, and injured 86. Due to overflowing rivers and dikes, 46,000 houses were flooded, including 141 "seriously". Around 7,700 homes were under water, and over 100 were destroyed. In addition, 67 bridges and 818 roads were damaged. A total of 2,560 people were homeless. Seven flights were called off and 27,000 air travelers were stranded. Train service was halted for hours and track lines were damaged in eight places. Total damages are estimated at ¥80.5 billion (US$339 million).

== See also ==
- Typhoon Sanba (2012)
- Typhoon Nepartak (2016)
- Typhoon Hagibis
- Hurricane Wilma – an Atlantic hurricane that underwent similar rapid intensification.
- Hurricane Patricia – a Pacific hurricane that underwent similar explosive intensification.
