= List of named storms (R) =

Storms are named for historical reasons to avoid confusion when communicating with the public, as more than one storm can exist at a time. Names are drawn in order from predetermined lists. For tropical cyclones, names are assigned when a system has one-, three-, or ten-minute winds of more than 65 km/h (40 mph). Standards, however, vary from basin to basin. For example, some tropical depressions are named in the Western Pacific, while within the Australian and Southern Pacific regions, the naming of tropical cyclones are delayed until they have gale-force winds occurring more than halfway around the storm center.

This list covers the letter R.

== Storms ==
Note: † indicates the name was retired after that usage in the respective basin

- Rachel

- 1984 – stayed out at sea.
- 1990 – made landfall on the southern tip of Baja California Sur and northwestern Mexico; killed 18.
- 1997† – made landfall in western Australia.
- 1999 – made landfall in Taiwan as a tropical depression.
- 2014 – a Category 1 hurricane that remained far out in sea.
- 2026 – a Category 3 hurricane moved along the coast of Mexico and struck California as a post-tropical cyclone.

- Rae

- 1980 – a weak tropical cyclone that affected Vanuatu.
- 1990 – a Category 2 tropical cyclone that affected a few South Pacific islands, killing 3 people.
- 2005 – a weak tropical cyclone that did not affect any landmasses.
- 2025† – a Category 2 tropical cyclone that affected in Fiji.

- Rafael

- 2012 – long-lived category 1 hurricane that produced minor damage in the northeastern Caribbean Sea.
- 2024 – late-season Category 3 hurricane that made landfall in western Cuba, dissipated in the Gulf of Mexico

- Ragasa (2025)† – a large and powerful Category 5 super typhoon that severely affected Luzon, Taiwan and Southeastern China. Also known as Nando within the PAR.
- Rai

- 2016 – a short-lived storm that made landfall on Indochina.
- 2021† – a powerful Category super typhoon that caused severe and widespread damage in the Southern Philippines. Also known as Odette within the PAR.

- Raja (1986)† – was a tropical cyclone that holds the 24-hour rainfall record of 674.9 mm (26.57 in) for the French Overseas Territory of Wallis and Futuna.
- Ramil

- 2009 – powerful Category 5 super typhoon that formed northwest of Kwajalein, and recurved off Luzon, becoming extratropical northeast of Japan.
- 2013 – Category 4 typhoon, which struck the Ryukyu Islands and Japan.
- 2017 – a Category 2 typhoon that impacted Vietnam and Cambodia.
- 2025 – a severe tropical storm that made landfall in Vietnam after causing significant impacts in parts of central Philippines.

- Rammasun

- 2002 – a Category 3 typhoon that affected the Ryukyu Islands and Korea; also contributed to flooding in the Philippines. Also known as Florita within the PAR.
- 2008 – a Category 4 typhoon that stayed out at sea. Also known as Butchoy within the PAR
- 2014† – a Category 5 super typhoon that impacted both the Philippines and South China, causing billions in damages. Also known as Glenda within the PAR.

- Ramon

- 1987 – a Category 4 major hurricane that remained at sea but generated torrential rains over Southern California.
- 2011 – a weak tropical storm that affected the Philippines.
- 2017 – a weak and short-lived tropical storm that stayed off the coast of southern Mexico.
- 2019 – a minimal typhoon that impacted northern Philippines.
- 2023 – late-season a weak tropical storm that formed at sea.

- Ramona

- 1967 – long-lived tropical storm that did not affect land.
- 1971 – did not affect any land areas.

- Rananim (2002)† – a Category 2 typhoon that impacted East China, causing damages of up to US$2.4 billion.
- Raoni (2021) – a rare South Atlantic subtropical storm.
- Raquel (2015) – the first tropical cyclone to exist within the South Pacific Ocean during the month of July on record; affected the Solomon Islands.
- Rashmi (2008) – a weak and short-lived tropical cyclone that impacted Bangladesh, killing 28 people.
- Ray (1975) – an early-season Australian severe tropical cyclone.
- Raymond

- 1983 – tied with Hurricane Kiko for the strongest tropical cyclone of the 1983 Pacific hurricane season.
- 1989 – a Category 4 hurricane that made landfall on the Baja California Peninsula as a tropical storm.
- 2005 – a Category 1 tropical cyclone that made landfall on the northern coast of Australia.
- 2013 – a Category 3 hurricane which briefly threatened the southwestern coast of Mexico before recurving back out to sea.
- 2019 – short-lived tropical storm which dissipated without affecting land.
- 2025 – short-lived storm which formed near Mexico and affected Baja California as a tropical depression.

- Rebecca

- 1961 – stayed out at sea.
- 1968 – a Category 1 hurricane that passed off the coast of Mexico.
- 1985 – made landfall in Queensland as a Category 1 storm.

- Rebekah (2019) – a subtropical storm that only persisted in the central Atlantic Ocean.
- Remal (2024) – a moderately intense tropical cyclone which affected coastal Bangladesh and West Bengal.
- Reming

- 1964 – not areas land.
- 1968 – a Category 1 typhoon that hit the Philippines and slightly sunk South Vietnam.
- 1972 – no ares land.
- 1976 – produced tremendous rainfall in Japan including, at the time, a national 24-hour record accumulation of 1,140 mm (44.8 in).
- 1980 – hit Taiwan.
- 1984 – one of the most intense tropical cyclones on record and the strongest storm of the 1984 season.
- 1988 – a weak tropical storm that hit the Philippines.
- 1992 – recurved away from land.
- 1996 – hit Philippines, Abel killed eight people, left seven others missing and caused $4.3 million.
- 2000 – killed 181 people in the Philippines and Taiwan.
- 2006† – an intense typhoon that killed at least 734 people in the Philippines and 98 people in Vietnam.

- Rena (1949) – a November tropical storm that affected the Philippines.
- Rene

- 2010 – a Category 3 severe tropical cyclone that caused significant damage in Tonga and American Samoa.
- 2020 – a weak storm that formed east of Cape Verde and then moved out to sea, earliest seventeenth named storm in the Atlantic basin.

- Rening (1999) – a weak system that impacted Vietnam bringing torrential rainfall.
- Reuben (2015) – a weak tropical cyclone that brought heavy flooding in parts of Fiji.
- Rewa

- 1983 – a severe tropical cyclone that remained far out in sea.
- 1993† – a Category 5 tropical cyclone and a system that lasted for 28-days.

- Rex (1998) – a Category 4 typhoon that stayed out at sea off Japan.
- Rhonda

- 1986 – affected Perth bringing heavy rain.
- 1997† – a May Category 4 severe tropical cyclone that later affected Western Australia.

- Richard (2010) – a late-October Category 2 hurricane that impacted Central America.
- Rick

- 1985 – strong category 4 hurricane, never a threat to land
- 1996 – minimal storm that stayed away from land
- 1997 – weak category 2 hurricane, made landfall in Mexico during November
- 2009 – powerful category 5 hurricane, one of the strongest to form during October and the third-most intense Pacific hurricane on record
- 2015 – weak tropical storm, never threatened land
- 2021 – strong category 2 hurricane, made landfall near Lázaro Cárdenas, Michoacán.

- Riley (2019) – a Category 3 severe tropical cyclone, causing minimal impacts in Northwestern Australia.
- Rina

- 2011 – a powerful but small Category 3 hurricane that made landfall in the Yucatán Peninsula.
- 2017 – a tropical storm that formed in the Central Atlantic.
- 2023 – a weak storm which remained far from any land.

- Rita

- 1948 –
- 1953 - hit China as a tropical storm
- 1958 - affected the Micronesian Islands; mostly stayed out at sea
- 1961 - stayed largely at sea with minor damage in Palau and the Mariana Islands
- 1963 - affected the Philippines, stayed out at sea
- 1964 –
- 1966 - stayed out at sea
- 1969 - short-lived system that stayed out at sea
- 1971 - caused flooding to Western Australia
- 1972 – the longest lasting Western Pacific tropical cyclone.
- 1975 – affected Japan and the Ryūkyū Islands.
- 1978 – one of the most intense tropical cyclones ever recorded, caused much damage in the Philippines.
- 2001 – a Category 1 tropical cyclone that remained far out in sea.
- 2005† – powerful Category 5 hurricane that caused extensive damage to Texas and Louisiana.
- 2019 – a November Category 3 severe tropical cyclone that affected the Solomon Islands.

- Ritang (1994) – a Category 5 super typhoon that affected East China and Taiwan.
- Roanu (2016) – a May tropical storm that affected Bangladesh and Sri Lanka.
- Robert (1977)† – a severe tropical cyclone that caused minor impacts in several South Pacific islands.
- Robyn

- 1975 – traversed much of the Indian Ocean.
- 1990 – a long-living tropical storm that caused minor impacts.
- 1993 – a Category 4 typhoon that affected Japan.
- 2010 – a tropical cyclone that stayed out in the central Indian Ocean.
- 2024 – a deadly tropical cyclone that contributed towards heavy rains and flooding throughout the Indonesian islands of Sumatra and Java.

- Roger

- 1979 – a weak and disorganised tropical storm in the Western Pacific.
- 1982 – a December severe tropical storm that brushed the coast of eastern Philippines.
- 1986 – a Category 2 typhoon that brushed the southern coast of Japan.
- 1989 – a strong tropical storm produced significant rainfall across the majority of Japan, affecting areas from the Ryukyu Islands to Hokkaido.
- 1993† – a Category 2 tropical cyclone that affected New Caledonia.

- Roke

- 2005 – a Category 1 storm that struck the Philippines in March 2005.
- 2011 – a Category 4 storm that struck Japan in September 2011.
- 2017 – made landfall in Hong Kong as a tropical depression.
- 2022 - a minimal typhoon that did not threaten any land areas.

- Rolf (2011) – an unusual Mediterranean tropical storm that brought flooding to Italy, France, Spain, and Switzerland in November 2011.
- Rolly

- 2004 – a Category 5 typhoon that impacted Japan.
- 2008 – affected the Philippines as a tropical depression
- 2020† – made landfall as a Category 5–equivalent super typhoon on Catanduanes in the Philippines and in Vietnam as a tropical storm.

- Romina (2024) – a weak tropical storm that formed near Brunei and Malaysia.
- Ron (1998)† – the strongest tropical cyclone on record to impact Tonga.
- Rona (1999)† – throated Queensland as a minimal tropical cyclone, but later re-developed into Cyclone Frank.
- Rosa

- 1978 — threatened Baja California.
- 1979 — struck northern Australia.
- 1982 — brushed southwestern Mexico.
- 1994 — a Category 2 hurricane that killed at least 4 people in Mexico and widespread flooding in the U.S. state of Texas that killed 22 people and caused hundreds of millions of dollars in damage in October 1994.
- 2000 – made landfall in Mexico as a weak tropical storm, causing minimal damage.
- 2006 – never threatened land.
- 2012 – never threatened land.
- 2018 – widespread flooding to northwestern Mexico and the Southwestern United States in late September 2018, and was the first tropical cyclone to make landfall in Baja California since Nora in 1997.

- Rosal

- 2022 – remained out at sea but caused 8 indirect deaths in the Philippines.
- 2026 – a extremely powerful Category 5 super typhoon that caused damage mainly in Mariana Islands, Taiwan, and Japan.

- Rosalie

- 1970 – a strong tropical storm that was in the open sea.
- 1974 – a weak tropical storm that was in the open sea.

- Rosalind (1947) – the first super typhoon ever recorded in the Northwest Pacific.
- Rose

- 1948 – a Category 1 typhoon that hit the Philippines and South China.
- 1952 – a Category 1 typhoon that passed off the coast of Japan.
- 1957 – a powerful Category 4 typhoon that did not make landfall.
- 1960 – a weak tropical storm that was in the open sea.
- 1963 – approached the Philippines and struck Japan.
- 1965 (April) – passed west of Réunion.
- 1965 (August) – approached the Philippines and struck China.
- 1968 – struck the Philippines and Vietnam.
- 1971 – struck the Philippines and China.
- 1974 – approached Ryūkyū Islands.
- 1978 – struck Taiwan.
- 2021 – a rather weak tropical storm that stayed at sea.

- Rosie

- 1971† – made landfall as a Category 1 tropical cyclone.
- 1997 – a Category 5 July super typhoon that affected Japan.
- 2008 – a Category 2 tropical cyclone that affected Christmas Island.

- Rosing

- 1963– became a Category 4-equivalent super typhoon but did not affect any land areas.
- 1967 – struck the Philippines.
- 1971 – struck the Philippines and China.
- 1975 – one of the most intense tropical cyclones on record, reaching 875 millibars.
- 1979 – a Category 3 typhoon that struck Japan and caused 12 deaths.
- 1983 – struck the Philippines and China.
- 1987 – struck the Philippines and Vietnam.
- 1991 – struck Japan and became the country's costliest typhoon ever.
- 1995† – a strong Category 5-equivalent typhoon that caused 882 fatalities and severe damage across the Philippines.

- Rosita

- 1990 – a Category 1 tropical cyclone that stayed out at sea.
- 2000† – a Category 5 severe tropical cyclone that made landfall in the Western Australia.
- 2018† – a Category 5 super typhoon which devastated the Mariana Islands and the Philippines.

- Roskas (2003)† – a Category 3 typhoon that did not affect any land.
- Roslyn

- 1964 – caused no damage or fatalities.
- 1986 – made landfall near Manzanillo.
- 1992 – developed in the open ocean, causing no damage or deaths.
- 2016 – weak tropical storm that never threatened land.
- 2022 – a Category 4 hurricane which struck the Mexican state of Nayarit.

- Roxanne (1995)† – a rare and erratic Category 3 hurricane that caused extensive flooding in Mexico.
- Roy

- 1981 – churned over the South China Sea.
- 1984 – a weak tropical storm that affected the Mariana Islands.
- 1988† – the second-most intense January Pacific typhoon on record; caused widespread damage on Guam and Rota.

- Rubing

- 1965 – hit southern Japan as an intense typhoon, killing 28 people.
- 1969 – relatively strong typhoon that paralleled the Philippine and Japanese coasts but remained at sea.
- 1977 – short-lived system only recognized by PAGASA.
- 1981 – a strong typhoon which impacted northern Philippines and China, with a death toll of at least 141 people, majority of which from the capsizing of BRP Datu Kalantiaw.
- 1985 – a devastating typhoon which struck central Vietnam, resulting to 769 fatalities.
- 1989 – a powerful typhoon that was the first of three typhoons to severely affect northern Philippines within one month; caused significant damage 119 deaths.
- 1993 – a typhoon which brushed northern Philippines before making landfall in China.
- 1997 – one of the most intense Pacific typhoons to exist in December; originally formed in the Central Pacific and eventually affected the Marshall Islands, Guam and Northern Mariana Islands, causing extensive damage but ultimately zero fatalities.

- Ruby

- 1950 – a category 3 typhoon that passed off the coast of Japan.
- 1954 – hit the Philippines as a typhoon, and hit China as a tropical storm.
- 1959 – did not affect any major land masses.
- 1961 – tropical storm that hit the Philippines and Vietnam.
- 1964 – struck near Hong Kong.
- 1967 – tropical storm that had little effect on the Philippines.
- 1970 – tropical storm that affected the Philippines and China.
- 1972 – not a threat to land
- 1976 – struck the Philippines and approached Japan.
- 1982 – not areas land.
- 1985 – struck Japan.
- 1988 – affected the Philippines and Hainan Island.
- 2014† – struck the Philippines
- 2021 – a strong tropical cyclone that impacted New Caledonia with strong winds and rainfall, after its predecessor tropical low and a nearby trough caused disruption over some parts of the Solomon Islands.

- Rumbia

- 2000 – impacted the Philippines.
- 2006 – a tropical storm in the Pacific that did not make landfall.
- 2013 – struck the Philippines, Hong Kong, and Macau.
- 2018† – a weak but costly tropical storm that struck China.

- Ruping

- 1966 – affected Japan as a severe tropical storm.
- 1970 – a minor tropical depression.
- 1974 – affected Taiwan as a severe tropical storm.
- 1978 – affected southwestern Japan as a minimal typhoon.
- 1982 – a Category 2 typhoon that impacted the Philippines and South China.
- 1986 – a tropical storm that affected the Philippines and Vietnam.
- 1990† – a catastrophic typhoon that devastated the Philippines, killing more than 700 people.

- Rusa (2002)† – mainly affected the Korean Peninsula, bringing damages of up to US$4 billion.
- Russ

- 1990 – a Category 4 typhoon that affected Micronesia and Guam.
- 1994 – affected South China bringing torrential rainfall which caused billions of damages.

- Rusty (2013)† – a Category 4 severe tropical cyclone that produced record duration gale-force winds in Port Hedland, Western Australia in late February 2013.
- Ruth

- 1945 – struck Japan
- 1951 – Category 4 typhoon, struck Japan killing 572 people and injuring another 2,644
- 1955 – Category 5 super typhoon, churned in the open ocean
- 1959 – far northeast of the Philippines
- 1962 – Category 5-equivalent super typhoon, remained east of Japan
- 1965 – remained out at sea
- 1967 – Category 3-equivalent typhoon, remained east of Japan
- 1970 – passed just south of Cape Cà Mau; also known as Aning within the PAR
- 1973 – Category 2-equivalent typhoon, crossed Luzon, Philippines, then hit Hainan Island, China and then Northeast Vietnam; also known as Narsing within the PAR
- 1977 – hit China; also known as Kuring within the PAR
- 1980 (February) – remained east of Queensland
- 1980 (September) – crossed Hainan Island before hitting northern Vietnam
- 1983 – dissipated east of the Philippines due to strong wind shear; also known as Ading within the PAR
- 1987 – caused severe damage in South China
- 1991 – Category 5 super typhoon, made landfall on northern Luzon with winds of 115 mph (185 km/h); also known as Trining within the PAR
- 1994 – short-lived storm, east of Japan

- Ryan

- 1992 – a Category 4 typhoon that passed eastern Japan.
- 1995 – a very strong typhoon which affected the Philippines, Taiwan and Japan but only caused 5 fatalities and minimal damage.

== See also ==
- European windstorm names
- Atlantic hurricane season
- List of Pacific hurricane seasons
- Tropical cyclone naming
- South Atlantic tropical cyclone
- Tropical cyclone
