= List of storms named Queenie =

The name Queenie has been used for six tropical cyclones in Western Pacific Ocean. For the Philippine Area of Responsibility, it replaced the name Quadro after it was removed for unknown reasons following the 2002 Pacific typhoon season.

Named by the United States Armed Services:

- Typhoon Queenie (1945) – a minimal typhoon that traversed through Luzon and China.

Named by PAGASA in the Philippines:

- Typhoon Chebi (2006) (T0620, 23W, Queenie) – struck the northern Philippines
- Tropical Storm Sinlaku (2014) (T1421, 22W, Queenie) – struck Philippines and Vietnam
- Typhoon Kong-rey (2018) (T1825, 30W, Queenie) – traversed the Ryukyu Islands before making landfall in South Korea
- Tropical Storm Banyan (2022) (T2223, 27W, Queenie) – remained out at sea.
- Typhoon Surigae (2026) (T2626, 25W, Queenie) – a Category 4 typhoon that passed near the coast of Japan.

Preceded by Pilandok	Pacific typhoon season names Queenie	Succeeded by Rosal
