= List of storms named Kading =

The name Kading has been used to name two tropical cyclones in the Philippine Area of Responsibility in the West Pacific Ocean:

- Tropical Storm Judy (1974) (T7431, 35W, Kading) – formed in the South China Sea
- Typhoon Rita (1978) (T7826, 29W, Kading) – one of the most intense tropical cyclones ever recorded, caused much damage in the Philippines.
