= List of storms named Tomas =

The name Tomas has been used for five tropical cyclones worldwide: one in the Atlantic Ocean, two in the Philippine Area of Responsibility by PAGASA in the West Pacific Ocean, and two in the South Pacific Ocean.

In the Atlantic:

- Hurricane Tomas (2010) – Category 2 hurricane which affected each Caribbean island group.

The name Tomas was retired in the Atlantic basin after the 2010 season and was replaced with Tobias.

In the West Pacific:

- Tropical Storm Trami (2006) (T0623, 26W, Tomas) – a weak tropical cyclone that did not affect land.
- Typhoon Man-yi (2018) (T1828, 34W, Tomas) – Category 2 typhoon, remained over the open ocean.

In the South Pacific:

- Cyclone Tomas (1994) – Category 3 tropical cyclone, remained over the open ocean
- Cyclone Tomas (2010) – Category 4 tropical cyclone, caused extensive damage in Fiji

The name Tomas was retired in the South Pacific after the 2009–10 season and replaced with Troy.

== See also ==
- Cyclone Tomasi (1983) – a South Pacific tropical cyclone with a similar name

Preceded by Samuel	Pacific typhoon season names Tomas	Succeeded by Umberto
