= List of storms named Rosalie =

The name Rosalie has been used for two tropical cyclones in the Eastern Pacific Ocean:

- Tropical Storm Rosalie (1970)
- Tropical Storm Rosalie (1974)
