= List of storms named Samuel =

The name Samuel has been used for two tropical cyclones in the Western Pacific Ocean. The name Samuel replaced the retired name Seniang, due to the number of damages in the Philippines caused by a tropical storm in 2014. Additionally, it was also used for a European windstorm which eventually became a "medicane", or a Mediterranean tropical-like cyclone.

In the Western Pacific:

- Tropical Storm Usagi (2018) (T1829, 33W, Samuel) – a Category 2-equivalent typhoon (a Severe Tropical Storm, according to the JMA) that made landfall in the Philippines and Vietnam.
- Typhoon Cempaka (2026) (T2632, 31W, Samuel) - a Category 2 typhoon that churned in the open ocean.

Preceded by Rosal	Pacific typhoon season names Samuel	Succeeded by Tomas

In Europe and the Mediterranean:

- Storm Samuel (2026) – a European windstorm which evolved into a Mediterranean tropical-like cyclone while affecting Spain and Libya in mid-March 2026; also known as Cyclone Jolina.
