= List of storms named Rubing =

The name Rubing was used for eight tropical cyclones by PAGASA and its predecessor, the Philippine Weather Bureau, in the Western Pacific Ocean.

- Typhoon Jean (1965) (T6515, 17W, Rubing) – hit southern Japan as an intense typhoon, killing 28 people.
- Typhoon Kathy (1969) (T6917, 21W, Rubing) – relatively strong typhoon that paralleled the Philippine and Japanese coasts but remained at sea.
- Tropical Depression Rubing (1977) – short-lived system only recognized by PAGASA.
- Typhoon Clara (1981) (T8120, 20W, Rubing) – a strong typhoon which impacted northern Philippines and China, with a death toll of at least 141 people, majority of which from the capsizing of BRP Datu Kalantiaw.
- Typhoon Cecil (1985) (T8521, 20W, Rubing) – a devastating typhoon which struck central Vietnam, resulting to 769 fatalities.
- Typhoon Angela (1989) (T8923, 26W, Rubing) – a powerful typhoon that was the first of three typhoons to severely affect northern Philippines within one month; caused significant damage 119 deaths.
- Typhoon Tasha (1993) (T9309, 16W, Rubing) – a typhoon which brushed northern Philippines before making landfall in China.
- Typhoon Paka (1997) (T9728, 05C, Rubing) – one of the most intense Pacific typhoons to exist in December; originally formed in the Central Pacific and eventually affected the Marshall Islands, Guam and Northern Mariana Islands, causing extensive damage but ultimately zero fatalities.
