= List of storms named Rebecca =

The names Rebecca and Rebekah have been used for three tropical cyclones and one subtropical cyclone worldwide.

In the Atlantic Ocean:

- Subtropical Storm Rebekah (2019) – a short-lived storm that formed over the far northern Atlantic and passed just north of the Azores.

In the East Pacific Ocean:

- Tropical Storm Rebecca (1961)
- Hurricane Rebecca (1968)

In the Australian region:

- Cyclone Rebecca (1985) – made landfall in Queensland as a Category 1 storm.
