= Typhoon Rita (1978) =

Pacific typhoon in 1978

Typhoon Rita (Kading)
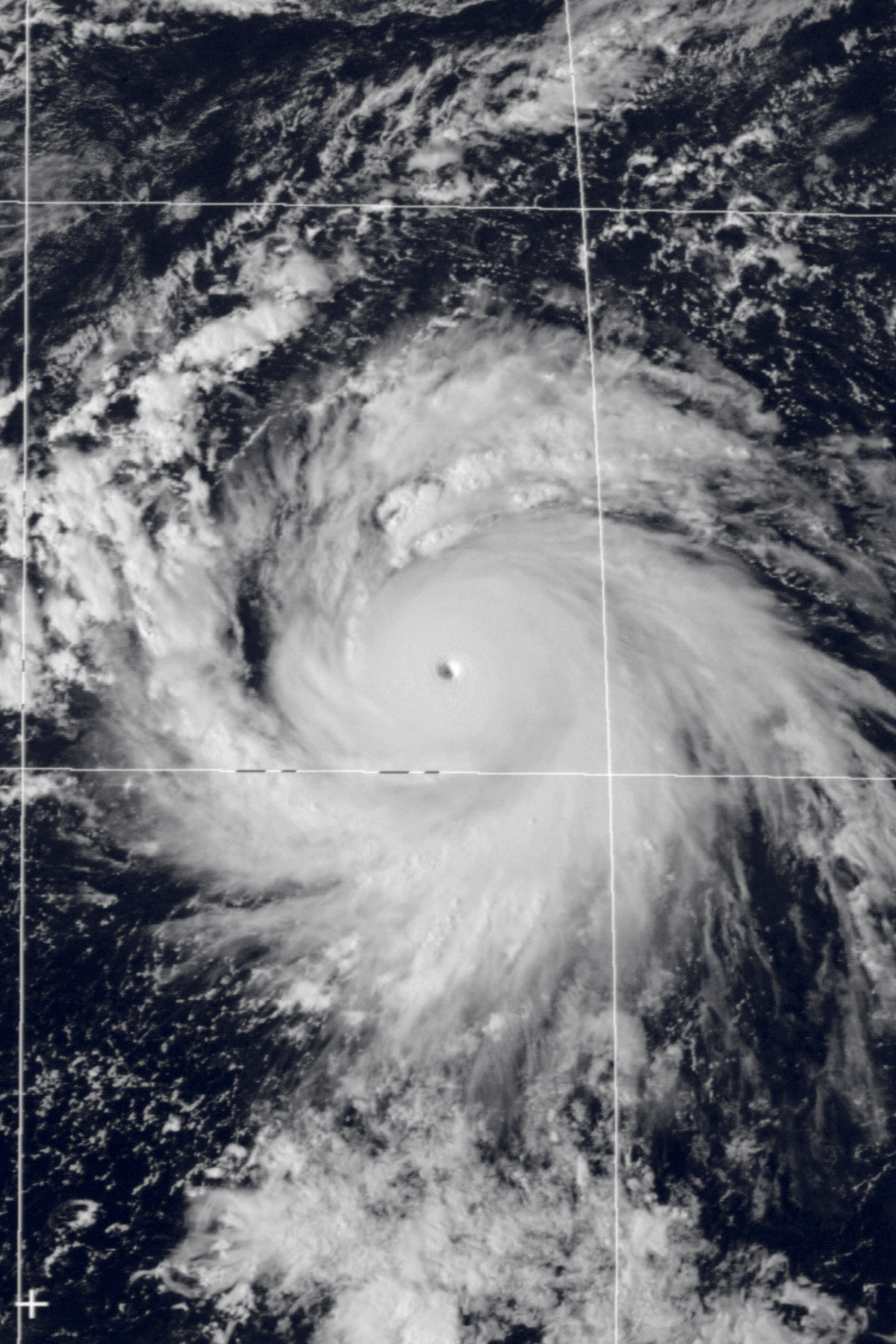
- Typhoon Rita near peak intensity on October 23

Meteorological history
- Formed: October 17, 1978
- Dissipated: October 29, 1978

Violent typhoon
- 10-minute sustained (JMA)
- Highest winds: 220 km/h (140 mph)
- Lowest pressure: 880 hPa (mbar); 25.99 inHg

Category 5-equivalent super typhoon
- 1-minute sustained (SSHWS/JTWC)
- Highest winds: 280 km/h (175 mph)
- Lowest pressure: 878 hPa (mbar); 25.93 inHg (Tied for seventh-lowest worldwide)

Overall effects
- Fatalities: ≥444 total
- Missing: 354
- Damage: $100 million (1978 USD)
- Areas affected: Guam, Philippines, Vietnam
- IBTrACS
- Part of the 1978 Pacific typhoon season

Typhoon Rita, known in the Philippines as Typhoon Kading, was a long-lived and destructive tropical cyclone which became the most powerful tropical cyclone of the 1978 Pacific typhoon season and one of the most intense tropical cyclones on record. Rita began its journey east of the Marshall Islands and rapidly moved westwards, becoming a typhoon on October 20. Rita continued rapid intensification and attained super typhoon status and later an atmospheric pressure of 878 mbar (25.9 inHg) on October 25. Rita struck the Philippines overnight on October 26 and entered the South China Sea as a minimal typhoon. Rita caused extreme damage and more than 300 deaths.

== Meteorological history ==
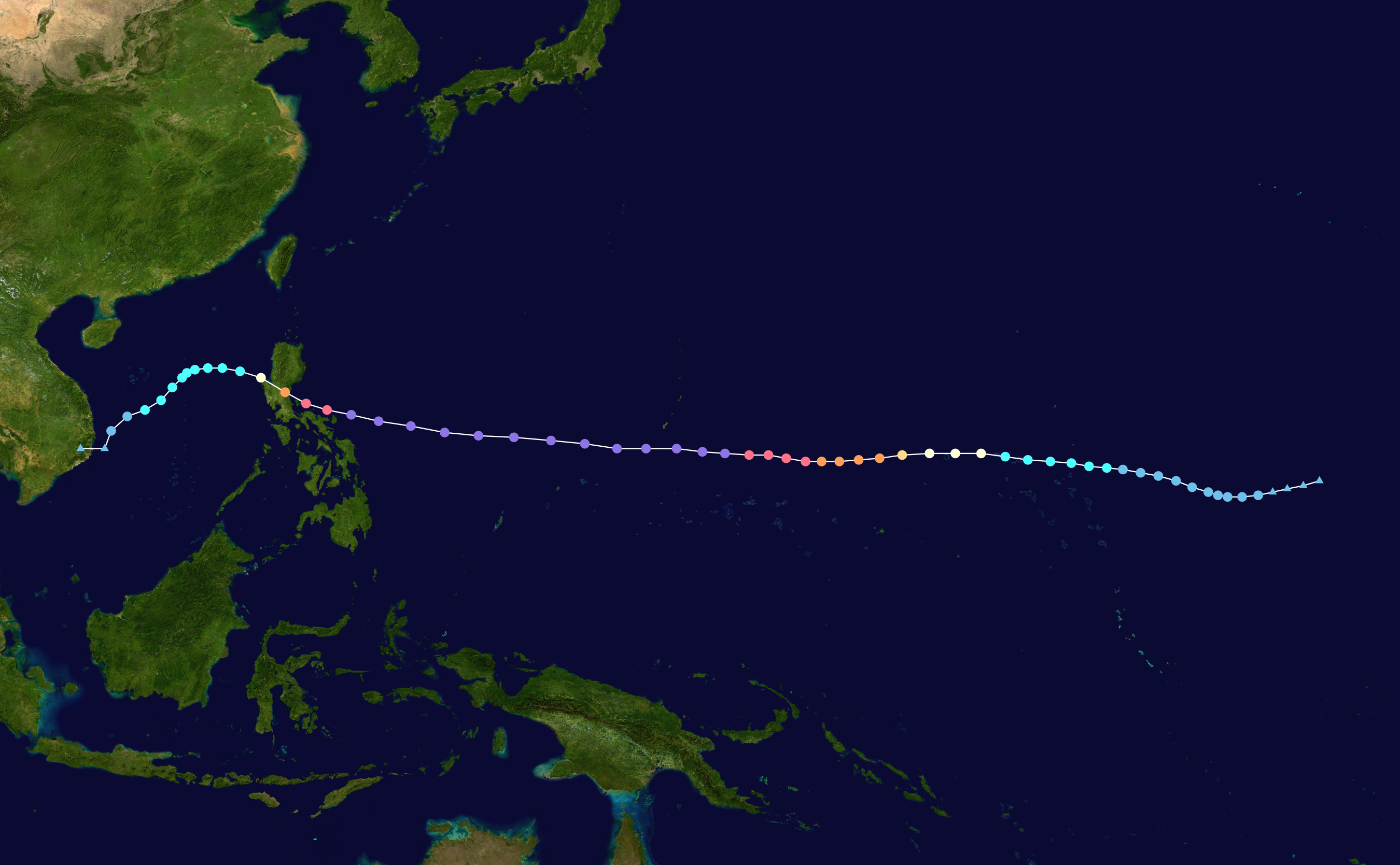
Map plotting the storm's track and intensity, according to the Saffir–Simpson scale Map key Saffir–Simpson scale Tropical depression (≤38 mph, ≤62 km/h) Tropical storm (39–73 mph, 63–118 km/h) Category 1 (74–95 mph, 119–153 km/h) Category 2 (96–110 mph, 154–177 km/h) Category 3 (111–129 mph, 178–208 km/h) Category 4 (130–156 mph, 209–251 km/h) Category 5 (≥157 mph, ≥252 km/h) Unknown Storm type Tropical cyclone Subtropical cyclone Extratropical cyclone, remnant low, tropical disturbance, or monsoon depression

Rita originated from a tropical depression that originated east of the Marshall Islands, near the International Date Line, on October 17. It rapidly intensified while moving westward and became a typhoon on October 20, about 500 mi (800 km) south-southwest of Wake Island. Rita continued rapid intensification and became a Category 4-equivalent super typhoon on October 23.

At 6:22 A.M., local time, on October 24, a reconnaissance aircraft reported a minimum pressure reading of 888 mbar (26.2 inHg) and maximum surface winds of 130 knots (150 mph). Rita continued to move westward and late in the evening of the same day, Rita passed 60 mi (97 km) of Guam, where heavy damages to banana plantations were reported. Rita continued moving rapidly westward towards Luzon at a speed of 23 knots (26 mph). Rita's central pressure fell to a minimum of 878 mbar (25.9 inHg) (Note: The Joint Typhoon Warning Center is a joint United States Navy – United States Air Force task force that issues tropical cyclone warnings for the western Pacific Ocean and other regions, and therefore, the pressure recorded by the task force may be unofficial.) when it was about 650 mi (1,050 km) east of Manila at noon on October 25. Satellite pictures received later in the afternoon revealed a distinct eye and good cirrus outflow associated with the circulation of Rita. During the following night, on October 26, Rita made landfall over Luzon, causing disastrous damage and leaving 200,000 homeless. Baler, located on the east coast of Luzon, reported gusts of 50 knots (58 mph) when the storm passed just to the south of it. Infanta, located 60 miles (97 km) south of Baler, reported a minimum sea-level pressure of 971.5 mbar (28.69 inHg).

Calibrated infrared animated loop of Rita persisting as a Super Typhoon for multiple days before landfall

Rita entered the South China Sea on October 27 and gradually accelerated in speed as it moved west-northwest towards Hainan. Its circulation remained intense with a large area of strong winds even though it weakened significantly after striking the Philippines. A fishing boat called the San Jose II went aground on a reef about 400 mi (640 km) southwest of Manila during the evening of October 27. In Hong Kong, the Stand By Signal, No. 1, was hoisted at 11:45 A.M. on October 27, when Rita was situated about 430 mi (690 km) to the southeast. Since an intense surge of winter monsoon was expected to reach the Southern Chinese coast. The combinations of the effects of Rita and the monsoon were forecast to cause strong winds in Hong Kong overnight. The Strong Wind Signal, No. 3, was hoisted at 4:30 PM although Rita was still situated 390 mi (630 km) south-southwest of Hong Kong and was moving west-northwest at 8 knots (9.2 mph) towards Hainan. At 5:00 A.M., Shangchuandao reported winds of 58 knots (67 mph) with gusts of 72 knots (83 mph).

Due to the influx of cold and dry air because the winter monsoon, the typhoon weakened rapidly and moved slowly southwestwards away from Hong Kong. during daytime on October 28. The system was closest to Hong Kong at 8:00 A.M. The central pressure was estimated to be about 990 millibars (29 inHg). On October 29, satellites received unveiled that the system became disorganized and the center of the system ill-defined. The monsoon still caused gale-forced winds over the South China Sea even though Rita had moved away from Hong Kong and weakened into a weak tropical storm. A cargo ship, the M.V. Toubkal went aground on the Scarborough Shoal, 460 mi (740 km) south-southeast of Hong Kong, and broke in two. Rita continued to weaken and degenerated into an area of low pressure, off the coast of South Vietnam, on October 29.

== Preparations and impact ==
Most intense tropical cyclones
	Cyclone	Season	Basin	Pressure	
	Cyclone	Season	Basin	hPa	inHg
1	Tip	1979	W. Pacific	870	25.7
2	Patricia	2015	E. Pacific	872	25.7
3	June	1975	W. Pacific	875	25.8
3	Nora	1973	W. Pacific	875	25.8
5	Forrest	1983	W. Pacific	876	25.9
6	Ida	1958	W. Pacific	877	25.9
7	Rita	1978	W. Pacific	878	26.0
8	Kit	1966	W. Pacific	880	26.0
8	Vanessa	1984	W. Pacific	880	26.0
10	Nancy	1961	W. Pacific	882	26.4
10	Wilma	2005	Atlantic	882	26.4
Source: JMA Typhoon Best Track Analysis. National Hurricane Center Tropical Cyclone Reports.

Before approaching the Philippines, flights to Guam were all canceled and U.S. Strategic Air Command evacuated all of its B-52 bombers to Kadena Air Base in Okinawa and naval aircraft were sent to Cubi Point in the Philippines.

While approaching the Philippines, authorities had all aircraft evacuated to Guam and Okinawa. All international flights in and out of Manila Airport were canceled. Philippine Airlines scrubbed all domestic flights and its airplanes were evacuated to the Southern Philippines. Schools and businesses in Manila and most of northern Luzon were closed.

=== Guam ===
In Guam, no major damage was reported even though there was crop damage that was not immediately determined. 2 U.S. Navy personnel were killed and a third was injured while taking an antenna from a building during preparations from Rita. The antenna came in contact with a high-voltage wire. 7 people were injured, 4 seriously injured in a head-on auto collision. Investigators reported that the road was wet and that there were wind gusts at the time of the collision. A civilian suffered multiple injuries when he fell from the sixth floor of an apartment building where he was boarding up windows. His condition is not immediately known.

=== Philippines ===
There were no immediate reports of casualties or damage in northern Luzon. However, Luzon was pounded by Rita's violent 90 mph (140 km/h) wind gusts and extremely torrential rains. Widespread power outages in Manila and Southern Luzon were reported when Rita passed 36 miles (58 km) north of the city, cutting off satellite communications links. Red Cross and national disaster officials reported that more than 4,000 people were moved to safer ground and evacuation continued. A youth was reported to be electrocuted by a falling wire near the capital and a Luzon couple was seriously injured when a tree fell on their house. Power lines in many provinces were toppled. Some areas experienced wind gusts as much as 125 miles per hour (201 km/h). Death toll from the storm was reported to have risen to more than 200 on October 31. A reported 354 other Filipinos were missing. The storm cut across rice-rich fields of the Central Luzon plains with 100 mph (160 km/h) winds. More than 50,000 homes were destroyed and displaced 291,610 families, a total of 1,444,465 people. Damage to infrastructure and agricultural crops was placed at more than $100 million (1979 USD) and about 750,000 acres of rice was damaged.

President Ferdinand E. Marcos declared 5 provinces calamity zones. He later ordered the suspension of the exporting of rice as a result of the extensive damage. Some areas experienced flooding that was waist-deep. It was reported that a Red Cross team sent to check reported that a dam had overflown and drowned 30 villagers outside the town of Norzagaray. In the Norzagaray area, 18 people were reported dead and 24 others missing. In the Angat area, where the Angat Dam is located, 6 people were dead and 20 were missing. U.S. Navy planes and helicopters saved 40 crewmen from a wrecked Moroccan ship that sunk in the South China Sea. The ship hit shoals 210 mi (340 km) northwest of Manila. It was blown there by the typhoon's powerful winds and high seas. The flood waters and the extremely powerful wind gusts of the storm caused 14,474 houses to be partly or seriously damaged; Manila reported gusts of up to 93 mph (150 km/h). Super Typhoon Rita was the worst typhoon to strike the Philippines in 8 years since Super Typhoon Joan in 1970.

== See also ==
- Other tropical cyclones named Rita
- Other tropical cyclones named Kading
- Typhoon Nora (1973) - Achieved a similar intensity while approaching the Philippines
- Typhoon Tip (1979) - The most intense tropical cyclone on record
- Typhoon Haiyan (2013) - Also had a relatively fast forward speed while approaching the Philippines, much stronger and deadlier landfall
- Typhoon Mangkhut (2018) - Also maintained super typhoon intensity for a long time before striking Luzon
