= List of storms named Rosal =

The name Rosal has been used for two tropical cyclones in the Philippine Area of Responsibility in the West Pacific Ocean. It replaced the name Rosita on the naming lists:

- Tropical Storm Pakhar (2022) (T2225, 29W, Rosal) – remained out at sea but caused 8 indirect deaths in the Philippines.
- Typhoon Champi (2026) (T2630, 29W, Rosal) – a extremely powerful Category 5 super typhoon that caused damage mainly in Mariana Islands, Taiwan, and Japan.

Preceded by Queenie	Pacific typhoon season names Rosal	Succeeded by Samuel
