= List of storms named Rosita =

The name Rosita has been used for three tropical cyclones worldwide, one in the Western Pacific ocean and two in the Australian Region.

in Western Pacific:

- Typhoon Yutu (2018) (T1826, 31W, Rosita) – a category 5 super typhoon which devastated the Mariana Islands and the Philippines.

The name Rosita was retired following the 2018 Pacific typhoon season and was replaced with Rosal, which means gardenia (Gardenia jasminoides) in Tagalog.

Australian region:

- Cyclone Rosita (1990) – stayed out at sea.
- Cyclone Rosita (2000) – a tropical cyclone that affected northern Australia from 15 April through 21 April 2000.
