= List of storms named Ryan =

The name Ryan was used for two tropical cyclones in the Northwestern Pacific Ocean:

- Typhoon Ryan (1992) (T9217, 17W) – a Category 4 typhoon that passed eastern Japan.
- Typhoon Ryan (1995) (T9514, 19W, Luding) – a very strong typhoon which affected the Philippines, Taiwan and Japan.
