= List of storms named Rhonda =

The name Rhonda has been used for two tropical cyclones in the Australian region of the Southern Hemisphere.

- Cyclone Rhonda (1986) – a Category 3 severe tropical cyclone that affected Western Australia bringing heavy rain.
- Cyclone Rhonda (1997) – a Category 4 severe tropical cyclone that later affected Western Australia.
