= List of storms named Rita =

The name Rita has been used for one tropical cyclone in the Atlantic Ocean, and ten tropical cyclones in the western Pacific Ocean.

Rita was used on the modern six-year lists in the Atlantic:

- Hurricane Rita (2005) – powerful Category 5 hurricane that caused extensive damage to Texas and Louisiana.

The name Rita was retired after its first and only use in the Atlantic, and was replaced by Rina for the 2011 Atlantic hurricane season.

Rita was also used for ten tropical cyclones in the western Pacific:

- Typhoon Rita (1948) (T4831)
- Typhoon Rita (1953) (T5310)
- Typhoon Rita (1958) (T5805)
- Tropical Storm Rita (1961) (T6101, 01W)
- Tropical Storm Rita (1963) (T6323, 42W, Trining)
- Typhoon Rita (1966) (T6610, 10W)
- Tropical Storm Rita (1969) (T6902, 02W)
- Typhoon Rita (1972) (T7207, 08W, Gloring) – the longest lasting Western Pacific tropical cyclone.
- Typhoon Rita (1975) (T7506, 08W) – affected Japan and the Ryūkyū Islands.
- Typhoon Rita (1978) (T7826, 29W, Kading) – one of the most intense tropical cyclones ever recorded, caused much damage in the Philippines.

Rita has also been used for four tropical cyclones in the southwest Pacific:

- Cyclone Rita (1964)
- Cyclone Rita (1971)
- Cyclone Rita (2001)
- Cyclone Rita (2019)
