= List of storms named Rene =

The name Rene has been used for two tropical cyclones worldwide.

In the North Atlantic Ocean:

- Tropical Storm Rene (2020), weak storm that formed east of Cape Verde and then moved out to sea, earliest seventeenth named storm in the Atlantic basin.

In the South Pacific Ocean:

- Cyclone Rene (2010), a severe tropical cyclone that passed through multiple islands, caused significant damage in Tonga and American Samoa.
