= List of storms named Ramona =

The name Ramona has been used for two tropical cyclones in the Eastern Pacific Ocean:

- Tropical Storm Ramona (1967)
- Tropical Storm Ramona (1971)
