= List of storms named Rewa =

The name Rewa has been used for two tropical cyclones in the South Pacific Ocean:

- Cyclone Rewa (1983) – a Category 4 severe tropical cyclone that remained far out at sea.
- Cyclone Rewa (1993) – a Category 5 tropical cyclone and a system that lasted for 28 days.

The name Rewa was retired after the 1993–94 season.

== See also ==
- Tropical Storm Rena (1949) – a West Pacific tropical storm with a similar name.
