= List of storms named Rosie =

The name Rosie has been used for three tropical cyclones worldwide.

In the Western North Pacific:

- Typhoon Rosie (1997) (T9709, 10W, Elang) – struck Japan.

In the Australian region:

- Tropical Cyclone Rosie (2008) – affected Christmas island after rapidly developing.

In the South Pacific Ocean:

- Tropical Cyclone Rosie (1970) – weak cyclone near New Caledonia.
