= List of storms named Russ =

The name Russ was used for two tropical cyclones in the Northwestern Pacific Ocean:

- Typhoon Russ (1990) – a Category 4 typhoon that affected Micronesia and Guam.
- Tropical Storm Russ (1994) – a moderate tropical storm that affected South China bringing torrential rainfall which caused billions of damages.
