= List of storms named Roger =

The name Roger has been used for five tropical cyclones worldwide: four in the Western Pacific Ocean and one in the Australian Region.

In the Western Pacific:

- Tropical Storm Roger (1979) (T7920, 22W, Trining) – a weak and disorganised tropical storm in the Western Pacific.
- Tropical Storm Roger (1982) (T8225, 28W, Bidang), – a December severe tropical storm that brushed the coast of eastern Philippines.
- Typhoon Roger (1986) (T8608, 08W, Heling) – a Category 2 typhoon that brushed the southern coast of Japan.
- Tropical Storm Roger (1989) (T8917, 20W, Narsing) – a strong tropical storm produced significant rainfall across the majority of Japan, affecting areas from the Ryukyu Islands to Hokkaido.

In the Australian Region:

- Cyclone Roger (1993) – a tropical cyclone that affected New Caledonia.
