= List of storms named Rose =

The name Rose has been used for twelve tropical cyclones worldwide, including once in the Atlantic, ten in the northwest Pacific Ocean and once in the southwest Indian Ocean.

In the Atlantic:

- Tropical Storm Rose (2021) – a rather weak tropical storm that stayed at sea.

In the northwest Pacific:

- Typhoon Rose (1948) (T4808)
- Typhoon Rose (1952) (T5215)
- Typhoon Rose (1957) (T5702)
- Tropical Storm Rose (1960) (T6007, 21W)
- Tropical Storm Rose (1963) (T6303, 10W, Bebeng) – approached the Philippines and struck Japan.
- Typhoon Rose (1965) (T6522, 27W, Unding) – approached the Philippines and struck China.
- Tropical Storm Rose (1968) (T6808, 12W, Gloring) – struck the Philippines and Vietnam.
- Typhoon Rose (1971) (T7121, 21W, Uring) – struck the Philippines and China.
- Tropical Storm Rose (1974) (T7417, 21W, Oyang) – approached Ryūkyū Islands.
- Tropical Storm Rose (1978) (T7804, 04W) – struck Taiwan.

In the southwest Indian:

- Cyclone Rose (1965) – passed west of Réunion

== See also ==
- Typhoon Mawar – a list of tropical cyclones with the name Mawar, which is the Malaysian word for "rose"
