= List of storms named Ruping =

The name Ruping was used for seven tropical cyclones by the Philippine Atmospheric, Geophysical and Astronomical Services Administration (PAGASA) and its predecessor, the Philippine Weather Bureau, in the Western Pacific Ocean.

- Severe Tropical Storm Helen (1966) (T6624, 26W, Ruping) – a strong tropical storm which struck Japan.
- Tropical Depression Ruping (1970) – long-lived tropical depression that was recognized by JMA and PAGASA; eventually made landfall in the northern part of the Philippines.
- Severe Tropical Storm Wendy (1974) (T7421, 25W, Ruping) – struck the Philippines and Taiwan as a potent tropical storm.
- Typhoon Irma (1978) (T7818, 19W, Ruping) – became a typhoon for only 12 hours before hitting Japan, claiming 6 lives.
- Typhoon Irving (1982) (T8217, 18W, Ruping) – impacted the middle portion of Philippines as a tropical storm before becoming a Category 1-equivalent typhoon in the South China Sea, killing 65.
- Tropical Storm Georgia (1986) (T8622, 19W, Ruping) – crossed central Philippines and central Vietnam as a moderately strong tropical storm.
- Typhoon Mike (1990) (T9025, 27W, Ruping) – an intense and deadly late-season typhoon that severely affected the Philippines and Vietnam, resulting to 816 fatalities; also the costliest Philippine typhoon until 2008.

Due to the severe loss of life and destruction brought by its 1990 iteration, the name Ruping was retired after 1990. It was replaced by Ritang, which was only used once:

- Typhoon Doug (1994) (T9413, 17W, Ritang) – the only Category 5-equivalent typhoon during 1994; caused 26 fatalities and notable damage in Taiwan and China.
