= List of storms named Rina =

The name Rina has been used for three tropical cyclones in the Atlantic Ocean, replacing Rita on the naming lists:

- Hurricane Rina (2011) – a Category 3 hurricane that made landfall in the Yucatán Peninsula
- Tropical Storm Rina (2017) – did not affect land
- Tropical Storm Rina (2023) – did not affect land

== See also ==
Storms with similar names

- Tropical Storm Rena (1949) – A West Pacific Ocean tropical cyclone
- Cyclone Rona (1999) – An Australian region severe tropical cyclone that contributed to the formation of Cyclone Frank
- Cyclone Trina (2001) – A South Pacific tropical cyclone that caused the worst flooding in Mangaia, Cook Islands in nearly 50 years
