= List of storms named Rae =

The name Rae has been used for four tropical cyclones in the South Pacific region of the Southern Hemisphere:

- Cyclone Rae (1980) – a weak tropical cyclone that affected Vanuatu.
- Cyclone Rae (1990) – a Category 2 tropical cyclone that affected a few South Pacific islands, killing 3 people.
- Cyclone Rae (2005) – a weak tropical cyclone that did not affect any landmasses.
- Cyclone Rae (2025) – a Category 2 tropical cyclone that affected in Fiji.

The name Rae was retired in the South Pacific basin after the 2024–25 season and replaced with Rex.
