= Typhoon Angela (1989) =

Pacific typhoon in 1989

Typhoon Angela (Rubing)
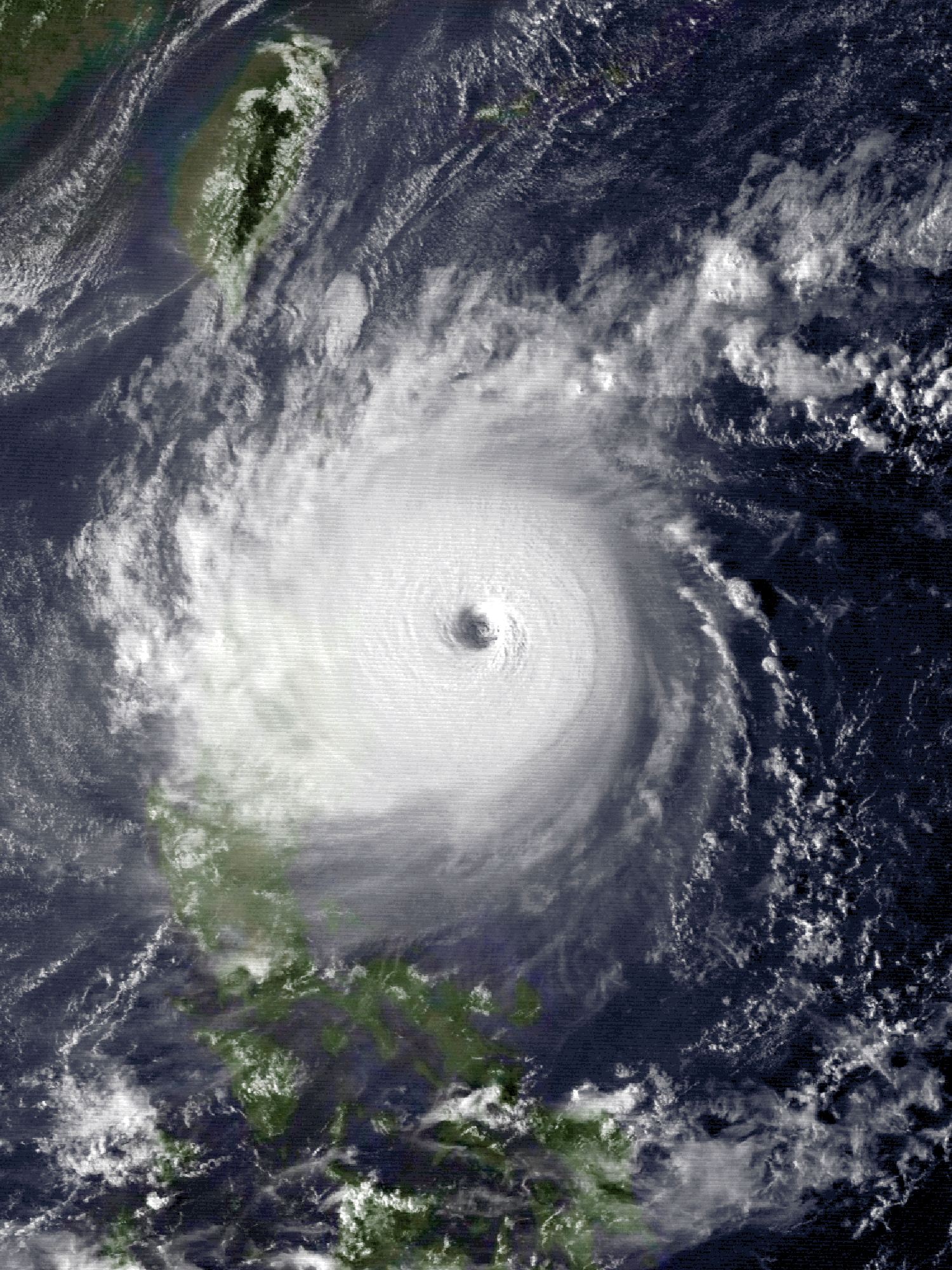
- Typhoon Angela on October 5, 1989

Meteorological history
- Formed: September 28, 1989
- Dissipated: October 11, 1989

Very strong typhoon
- 10-minute sustained (JMA)
- Highest winds: 175 km/h (110 mph)
- Lowest pressure: 925 hPa (mbar); 27.32 inHg

Category 4-equivalent super typhoon
- 1-minute sustained (SSHWS/JTWC)
- Highest winds: 240 km/h (150 mph)
- Lowest pressure: 910 hPa (mbar); 26.87 inHg

Overall effects
- Fatalities: 119
- Damage: $8 million (1989 USD)
- Areas affected: Philippines and Vietnam
- IBTrACS
- Part of the 1989 Pacific typhoon season

Typhoon Angela, known in the Philippines as Super Typhoon Rubing, was an intense tropical cyclone that formed in late September 1989. The storm developed from a tropical disturbance in the monsoon trough and moved generally westward throughout its duration. The storm ultimately peaked in intensity as a super typhoon and struck northern Luzon in the Philippines. After weakening and traversing the South China Sea, Angela bypassed Hainan to the south and struck Vietnam before dissipating. The storm caused severe damage and 119 fatalities in the Philippines. Thousands of houses were damaged, and hundreds of thousands of residents were impacted by the typhoon. Monetary damage is placed at $8 million.

== Meteorological history ==
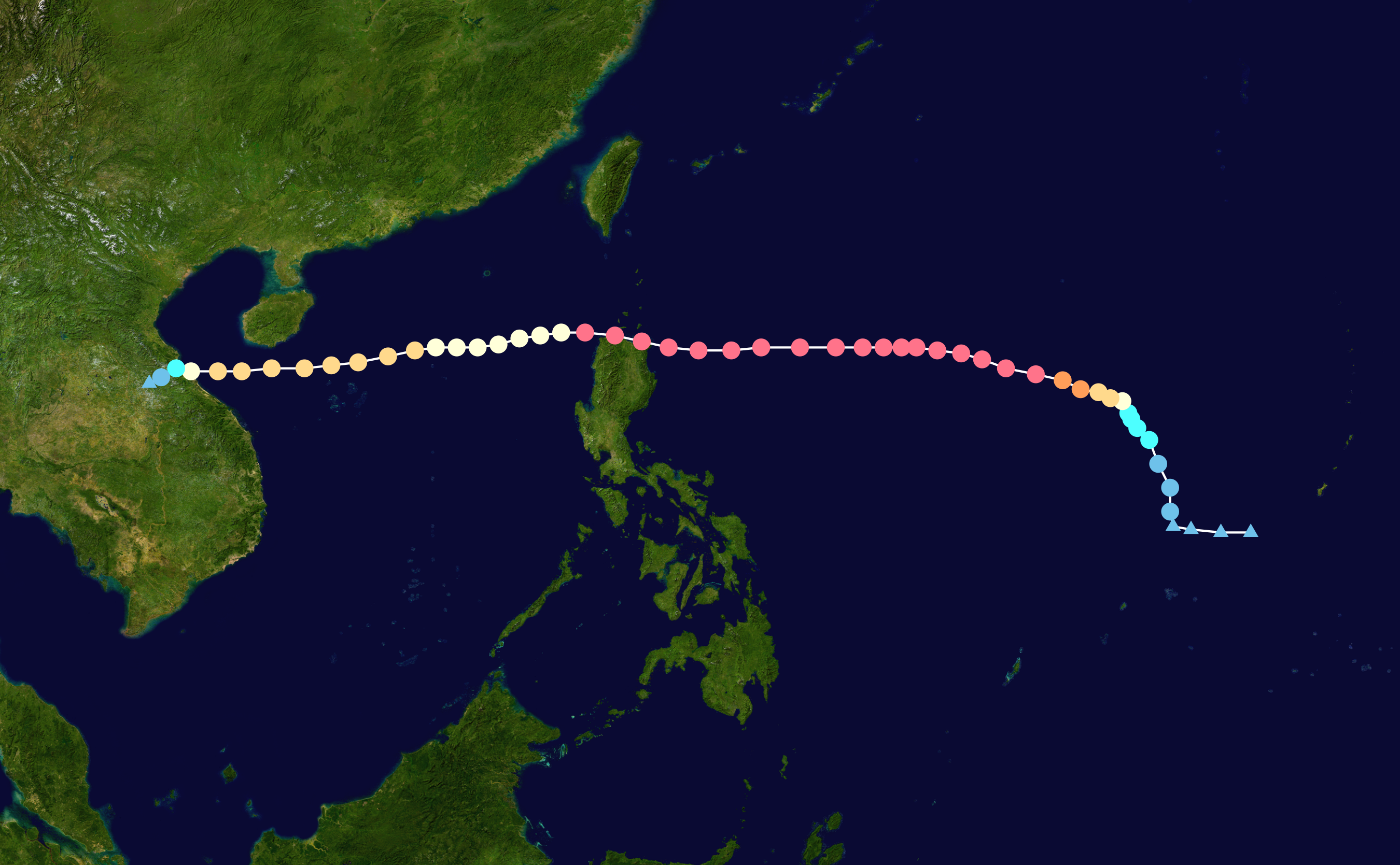
Map plotting the storm's track and intensity, according to the Saffir–Simpson scale Map key Saffir–Simpson scale Tropical depression (≤38 mph, ≤62 km/h) Tropical storm (39–73 mph, 63–118 km/h) Category 1 (74–95 mph, 119–153 km/h) Category 2 (96–110 mph, 154–177 km/h) Category 3 (111–129 mph, 178–208 km/h) Category 4 (130–156 mph, 209–251 km/h) Category 5 (≥157 mph, ≥252 km/h) Unknown Storm type Tropical cyclone Subtropical cyclone Extratropical cyclone, remnant low, tropical disturbance, or monsoon depression

The origins of Typhoon Angela trace back to a tropical disturbance in the monsoon trough that became very active after a lull in convection. The disturbance developed over the western Caroline Islands, and persisted for two days until it was noted in a Significant Tropical Weather Advisory issued by the Joint Typhoon Warning Center (JTWC). It rapidly matured, and prompted a Tropical Cyclone Formation Alert shortly thereafter. Enhanced upper-level outflow assisted the storm's intensification. At 0600 UTC on September 28, the Japan Meteorological Agency (JMA) recognized the storm as a tropical depression. The JTWC issued their first advisory on the depression, designated 34W, at 0600 UTC on September 29. However, at the same time, the JMA upgraded it to a tropical storm.

At 1800 UTC on September 29, the JTWC classified the depression as Tropical Storm Angela. The system initially tracking northwestward, Angela turned westward along the southern periphery of a subtropical ridge to the north. The tropical storm began to rapidly intensify, and the JMA upgraded it to a severe tropical storm at 1800 UTC on September 30, while the JTWC estimated that it had attained typhoon intensity. The JMA then upgraded Angela to a typhoon shortly thereafter, and assessed it as having reached peak intensity on October 2, with 10-minute maximum sustained winds of 175 km/h (110 mph) and a minimum barometric pressure of 925 millibars. Continuing westward, the typhoon attained super typhoon status four days later, and the JTWC reported that Angela peaked in strength on October 5. Between October 5 and October 6, Angela crossed the northern coast of Luzon in the Philippines.

The storm weakened after interacting with land, and the JTWC downgraded it to a typhoon on October 6 as it emerged into the South China Sea. An area of high pressure built over China, pushing Angela towards the southwest. Wind shear over the area weakened somewhat, and the typhoon re-intensified. However, as it passed south of Hainan, the cyclone again weakened due to the interaction with land. At 0600 UTC on October 10, Angela struck the coast of Vietnam and moved ashore. The JTWC issued their final advisory on the system at 1200 UTC, at which time the JMA downgraded it to a severe tropical storm, to a tropical storm six hours later, and to a tropical depression early on October 11.

== Preparations and impact ==
On October 6, Angela prompted the issuance of the Stand By Signal No. 1 in Hong Kong. It was replaced by a Strong Wind Signal No. 3 the next day, and after the typhoon's closest approach to the region on October 8, a Strong Monsoon Signal was hoisted. One-hour sustained winds reached 39 mph (63 km/h), out of the east, at Waglan Island. Gusts at Tate's Cairn peaked at 51 mph (82 km/h) from the north-northeast.

Angela caused severe damage in the Philippines. It is estimated that 119 people perished, and 192 more were injured. Additionally, 28 remained missing following the storm. In total, 219,178 people, or 39,095 families, were affected by the cyclone. About 33,309 homes sustained some degree of damage. The typhoon's intense winds and heavy rainfall triggered flooding and damaged crops. The hardest-hit areas were in the Cagayan province. Overall, the storm left approximately $8 million (1989 USD) in damage across the region. The same area was impacted by Typhoon Sarah in September. Angela forced thousands of residents to seek shelter in evacuation centers.

The JTWC issued 46 warnings on the storm over the course of 12 days, the longest of any storm during the season. Angela was among the five storms to attain super typhoon status in 1989, and was deemed the most severe typhoon of the year, at the time, in the Philippines.

== See also ==
- 1989 Pacific typhoon season
- Typhoons in the Philippines
- Typhoon Yinxing (2024) – a strong typhoon which had a similar track and intensity, but caused less damage compared to Angela
