= Josh Morgerman =

American storm chaser (born 1970)

- Born: January 21, 1970 (age 56); New York, U.S.
- Education: Harvard University
- Occupations: Storm chaser, TV personality, field correspondent, co-founder of Symblaze
- Known for: Multitude of successful tropical cyclone chases
- Website: http://www.icyclone.com

Joshua Morgerman (born January 21, 1970) is an American businessman, storm chaser, TV personality, and field correspondent best known for his multitude of tropical cyclone chases. Morgerman developed an interest in meteorology at an early age after seeing the effects of Hurricane Belle at his home in Long Island at age six. After graduating from Harvard University in 1992, he co-founded the digital advertising company Symblaze in 1999. His storm chasing career began in earnest in 2005 with Hurricane Wilma in Florida.

With no formal education in meteorology, all his experience comes from the chases. In all the years he has been chasing, Morgerman has intercepted 89 tropical cyclones, including Category 5 storms Hurricane Dean in 2007, Typhoon Haiyan in 2013, Hurricane Patricia in 2015, Typhoon Mangkhut and Hurricane Michael in 2018, Hurricane Dorian in 2019, and Hurricane Melissa in 2025. In total, he has successfully entered the eye of 62 hurricane-force tropical cyclones, with the strongest being Hurricane Melissa. Morgerman has also chased cyclones across 14 different countries or territories, but primarily in the United States and Mexico.

== Early life ==
Josh Morgerman was born in 1970 and grew up in Huntington, New York—part of suburban New York City. Living on Long Island, he developed an interest in meteorology at an early age; his mother attributes part of this interest to him seeing The Wizard of Oz when Morgerman was four. In August 1976, Hurricane Belle struck Long Island as a Category 1 hurricane, causing significant damage in his hometown, and beginning his fascination with meteorology.

At his father's insistence, Morgerman pursued a liberal arts degree at Harvard University rather than focusing on meteorology. In 1991, while attending Harvard, Morgerman went on his first hurricane chase: Hurricane Bob in Rhode Island.

In 1999, Morgerman co-founded the digital advertising company Symblaze alongside his friend Michael Horton. By 2004, he was living in Prague, Czech Republic, to work with Eastern European clientele.

== Personal life ==
Morgerman has no spouse nor kids, wishing to remain unburdened by family responsibilities to pursue cyclone chases. In his spare time, Morgerman often studies historic tropical cyclones. Morgerman moved to Bay St. Louis, Mississippi, during the COVID-19 pandemic in order to make chasing easier during travel restrictions. Morgerman grew attached to the city and the region, and eventually built a hurricane-resistant home in the city, making the city his place of residence.

== iCyclone ==
Since 1991, Morgerman has been chasing tropical cyclones. His goal is to "core punch" the storms and record atmospheric pressure and document the experience. With no formal education in meteorology, Morgerman's cyclone chasing is a passion project. All of his experience is in the field, though he advertises himself as an "adrenaline junkie". In an interview with The Washington Post in 2012, he stated this to be the primary motivator for chasing.

He often relies on his instincts backed up by years of chasing cyclones. Morgerman leads the iCyclone chase team. Members include his "right-hand guy" Scott Brownfield who coordinates logistics or assists on chases, meteorologists Adam Moyer and Jorge González who provide forecasting information, and Cory Van Pelt who serves as the iCyclone technician. In 2013, iCyclone expanded their chase region to East Asia, teaming up with fellow chasers James Reynolds and Mark Thomas. They ultimately intercepted four typhoons in one month including Typhoon Haiyan which devastated the Philippines. Since 2014, his chasing has been funded by multiple media agencies including CBS, the Weather Channel, and WeatherNation. In 2017, Morgerman conducted his first and so far only Australian chase, intercepting Cyclone Debbie in Queensland.

=== Data collection and usage ===
Morgerman collects atmospheric pressure with multiple Kestrel 4500s. The data he has collected has been utilized by the National Hurricane Center (NHC) in multiple instances to refine landfall intensities. 2011's Hurricane Rina's landfall in the Yucatán Peninsula was adjusted in light of his observations. In conjunction with satellite intensity estimates, his measurement of 975 mbar (28.8 inHg) within the eye of Hurricane Ernesto in 2012 was utilized to upgrade the hurricane's landfall intensity to Category 2.

In 2014, Morgerman's measurement of 943.1 mbar (27.85 inHg) within Hurricane Odile resulted in the landfall pressure being adjusted to 941 mbar (27.8 inHg) from the operational estimate of 930 mbar (27 inHg). His observation of 937.8 mbar (27.69 inHg) in 2015's Hurricane Patricia, in conjunction with two nearby automated measurements, assisted in more accurately analyzing the hurricane's strength at landfall. Meteorologists at the NHC concluded an approximate minimum pressure of 932 mbar (27.5 inHg), yielding estimated winds of 150 miles per hour (240 km/h); this made Patricia the strongest Pacific hurricane on record to strike Mexico. The record was later surpassed by Hurricane Otis, which became the first Pacific hurricane on record to make landfall at Category 5 intensity, surpassing Hurricane Patricia accordingly.

Morgerman provided the only observed over-land pressure with Hurricane Willa's Mexican landfall in 2018. He observed a value of 968 mbar (28.6 inHg), corroborating the NHC's landfall intensity of 115 miles per hour (185 km/h).

In 2016, Morgerman collaborated with meteorologist Andrew Hagen and Mexican researchers Erik Sereno Trabaldo and Jorge Abelardo González to reanalyze the 1959 Mexico hurricane, then considered to be the strongest landfalling hurricane on the Pacific coast of Mexico. Their analysis determined the storm to have been significantly weaker than originally estimated and resulted in its downgrade from a Category 5 to a Category 4. These revisions were later incorporated into the NHC's Hurricane Database. In 2017, Morgerman co-authored an academic paper published by the American Meteorological Society on the intensity of 2015's Hurricane Patricia. He provided in-situ data describing the structure of the storm and allowing for a more thorough analysis of its landfall.

== Tropical cyclone chases ==
As of October 2026, he has chased 97 cyclones across Australia, East Asia, and North America. Of his successful core penetrations, six were Category 5, 14 were Category 4, and 21 were Category 3.

Morgerman's successful interceptions
A map of the successful interceptions. Only hurricane strength cyclones are included.

List of tropical cyclone chases and experiences by Josh Morgerman and the iCyclone team
Year	Date	Storm	Chase location	Landfall intensity (SSHWS)	Recorded pressure	Relative position	Team	Ref.
1976	August 9–10	Hurricane Belle	Huntington, New York, United States	Category 1 hurricane	—N/a	Inside eye	—N/a	
1985	September 27	Hurricane Gloria	Huntington, New York, United States	Category 1 hurricane	965 mbar (28.5 inHg)	Inside eye	—N/a	
1991	August 19	Hurricane Bob	Providence, Rhode Island, United States	Category 2 hurricane	—N/a	Eyewall	Solo	
1999	August 22–23	Hurricane Bret	Riviera, Texas, United States	Category 3 hurricane	—N/a	Eyewall	Solo	
2005	October 24	Hurricane Wilma	Everglades City, Florida, United States	Category 3 hurricane	—N/a	Inside eye	Tony Brite	
2007	August 21	Hurricane Dean	Chetumal, Quintana Roo, Mexico	Category 5 hurricane	—N/a	Eyewall	Solo	
2008	July 23	Hurricane Dolly	Port Isabel, Texas, United States	Category 1 hurricane	—N/a	Eyewall	Scott Brownfield	
2008	September 1	Hurricane Gustav	Berwick/Morgan City, Louisiana, United States	Category 2 hurricane	—N/a	Inside eye	Scott Brownfield	
2008	September 13	Hurricane Ike	Texas City, Texas, United States	Category 2 hurricane	—N/a	Inside eye	Solo	
2009	September 1–2	Hurricane Jimena	San Carlos, Baja California Sur, Mexico	Category 2 hurricane	—N/a	Inside eye	Solo	
2010	June 30 – July 1	Hurricane Alex	Guadalupe Victoria, Tamaulipas, Mexico	Category 2 hurricane	—N/a	Inside eye	Jorge González	
2010	September 17	Hurricane Karl	Veracruz City, Veracruz, Mexico	Category 3 hurricane	985.9 mbar (29.11 inHg)	Inside eye	Solo	
2010	October 24–25	Hurricane Richard	Missed	—N/a	—N/a	—N/a	Solo	
2011	September 17	Tropical Storm Don	Riviera Beach, Texas, United States	Tropical storm	1,008.2 mbar (29.77 inHg)	Inside diffuse center	Cory Van Pelt	
2011	August 27	Hurricane Irene	Marshallberg, North Carolina, United States	Category 1 hurricane	953.0 mbar (28.14 inHg)	Inside eye	Keith Nugent	
2011	August 28	Hurricane Irene	New York City/Island Park, New York, United States	Tropical storm	—N/a	Inside eye	Keith Nugent	
2011	October 11–12	Hurricane Jova	Emiliano Zapata, Jalisco, Mexico	Category 2 hurricane	985.2 mbar (29.09 inHg)	Eyewall	Jim Edds	
2011	October 27–28	Hurricane Rina	Paamul, Quintana Roo, Mexico	Tropical storm	996.5 mbar (29.43 inHg)	Inside center	Solo	
2012	August 7–8	Hurricane Ernesto	Buenavista, Quintana Roo, Mexico	Category 2 hurricane	975.0 mbar (28.79 inHg)	Eyewall	Solo	
2012	August 28–29	Hurricane Isaac	Galliano, Louisiana, United States	Category 1 hurricane	970.0 mbar (28.64 inHg)	Inside eye	Solo	
2013	September 16	Hurricane Ingrid	Lavaderos, Tamaulipas, Mexico	Tropical storm	—N/a	Eyewall	Jorge González	
2013	October 5–6	Typhoon Fitow	Miyakojima, Okinawa, Japan	Category 2 typhoon	—N/a	Eyewall	James Reynolds, Mark Thomas	
2013	October 7	Typhoon Danas	Oku, Okinawa, Japan	Category 4 typhoon	950.6 mbar (28.07 inHg)	Inside eye	James Reynolds, Mark Thomas	
2013	October 11	Typhoon Nari	Baler, Aurora, Philippines	Category 3 typhoon	—N/a	Eyewall	James Reynolds	
2013	November 8	Typhoon Haiyan	Tacloban, Leyte, Philippines	Category 5 super typhoon	959.9 mbar (28.35 inHg)	Eyewall	James Reynolds, Mark Thomas	
2014	July 8	Typhoon Neoguri	Miyakojima, Okinawa Prefecture, Japan	Did not make landfall	964.8 mbar (28.49 inHg)	Outside eyewall	James Reynolds, Mark Thomas	
2014	September 14–15	Hurricane Odile	Cabo San Lucas, Baja California Sur, Mexico	Category 3 hurricane	943.1 mbar (27.85 inHg)	Inside eye	Steve Crighton	
2014	October 14	Typhoon Vongfong	Kagoshima, Kagoshima Prefecture, Japan	Tropical storm	975.5 mbar (28.81 inHg)	Inside center	Steve Crighton	
2015	August 8	Typhoon Soudelor	Hualien City, Hualien County, Taiwan	Category 3 typhoon	952.8 mbar (28.14 inHg)	Inside eye	Anthony van Dyck	
2015	August 23	Typhoon Goni	Ishigaki, Okinawa, Japan	Category 3 typhoon	944.2 mbar (27.88 inHg)	Eyewall	Solo	
2015	September 28	Typhoon Dujuan	Su'ao, Yilan County, Taiwan	Category 4 typhoon	958.3 mbar (28.30 inHg)	Inside eye	Solo	
2015	October 23	Hurricane Patricia	Emiliano Zapata, Jalisco, Mexico	Category 4 hurricane	937.8 mbar (27.69 inHg)	Inside eye	Erik Sereno	
2016	July 8	Typhoon Nepartak	Taitung City, Taitung County, Taiwan	Category 3 typhoon	957.7 mbar (28.28 inHg)	Eyewall	Solo	
2016	August 3–4	Hurricane Earl	Belize City, Belize District, Belize	Category 1 hurricane	982.2 mbar (29.00 inHg)	Inside eye	Solo	
2016	September 1–2	Hurricane Hermine	Hampton Springs, Florida, United States	Category 1 hurricane	986.2 mbar (29.12 inHg)	Inside eye	Solo	
2016	September 5–6	Hurricane Newton	Cabo San Lucas, Baja California Sur, Mexico	Category 1 hurricane	984.3 mbar (29.07 inHg)	Inside eye	Solo	
2016	September 27	Typhoon Megi	Hualien City, Hualien County, Taiwan	Category 3 typhoon	949.2 mbar (28.03 inHg)	Inside eye	Anthony van Dyck	
2016	October 6	Hurricane Matthew	Nassau, New Providence, Bahamas	Category 4 hurricane	977.8 mbar (28.87 inHg)	Outside eyewall	Solo	
2016	October 19–20	Typhoon Haima	Tuguegarao, Cagayan, Philippines	Category 4 typhoon	942.0 mbar (27.82 inHg)	Inside eye	Solo	
2017	March 28–29	Cyclone Debbie	Gregory River, Queensland, Australia	Category 3 cyclone	958.7 mbar (28.31 inHg)	Inside eye	Solo	
2017	August 6	Typhoon Noru	Toi, Miyazaki, Japan	Category 1 typhoon	977.1 mbar (28.85 inHg)	Eyewall	Solo	
2017	August 9–10	Hurricane Franklin	Vega de Alatorre, Veracruz, Mexico	Category 1 hurricane	990.4 mbar (29.25 inHg)	Inside eye	Solo	
2017	August 25–26	Hurricane Harvey	Rockport, Texas, United States	Category 4 hurricane	940.8 mbar (27.78 inHg)	Inside eye	Solo	
2017	September 10	Hurricane Irma	Naples, Florida, United States	Category 3 hurricane	940.0 mbar (27.76 inHg)	Inside eye	Solo	
2017	September 20	Hurricane Maria	Palmas del Mar, Humacao, Puerto Rico	Category 4 hurricane	929.4 mbar (27.45 inHg)	Eyewall	Solo	
2017	October 7–8	Hurricane Nate	Ocean Springs, Mississippi, United States	Category 1 hurricane	985.5 mbar (29.10 inHg)	Inside eye	Solo	
2017	October 22–23	Typhoon Lan	Omaezaki, Shizuoka Prefecture, Japan	Category 2 typhoon	952.8 mbar (28.14 inHg)	Inside eye	Solo	
2018	August 21	Typhoon Soulik	Kasaricho Oaza Yo, Kagoshima Prefecture, Japan	Category 2 typhoon	—N/a	Eyewall	Caroline Menzies	
2018	August 23	Typhoon Cimaron	Muroto, Kōchi, Japan	Category 1 typhoon	973.7 mbar (28.75 inHg)	Inside eye	Caroline Menzies	
2018	September 4	Typhoon Jebi	Mihama, Wakayama, Japan	Category 2 typhoon	967.1 mbar (28.56 inHg)	Eyewall	Oli Sloane	
2018	September 15	Typhoon Mangkhut	Buguey, Cagayan, Philippines	Category 5 super typhoon	942.2 mbar (27.82 inHg)	Eyewall	Oli Sloane	
2018	October 10	Hurricane Michael	Callaway, Florida, United States	Category 5 hurricane	923.2 mbar (27.26 inHg)	Inside eye	Oli Sloane, Matt Delaloye	
2018	October 23	Hurricane Willa	Palmito del Verde, Sinaloa, Mexico	Category 3 hurricane	968.0 mbar (28.59 inHg)	Inside eye	Erik Sereno, Caroline Menzies	
2018	October 30	Typhoon Yutu	Dilasag, Aurora, Philippines	Category 3 typhoon	960.4 mbar (28.36 inHg)	Eyewall	Caroline Menzies, James Levelle	
2019	September 1	Hurricane Dorian	Marsh Harbour, Abaco, Bahamas	Category 5 hurricane	913.4 mbar (26.97 inHg)	Inside eye	Solo	
2019	October 12–13	Typhoon Hagibis	Shimoda, Shizuoka, Japan	Category 2 typhoon	958.5 mbar (28.30 inHg)	Inside eye	Solo	
2019	December 2–3	Typhoon Kammuri	Legazpi, Albay, Philippines	Category 4 typhoon	962.9 mbar (28.43 inHg)	Inside eye	Solo	
2020	July 25	Hurricane Hanna	Port Mansfield, Texas, United States	Category 1 hurricane	—N/a	Inside eye	Solo	
2020	August 3−4	Hurricane Isaias	Ocean Isle Beach, North Carolina, United States	Category 1 hurricane	990.3 mbar (29.24 inHg)	Inside eye	Solo	
2020	August 26−27	Hurricane Laura	Sulphur, Louisiana, United States	Category 4 hurricane	948.0 mbar (27.99 inHg)	Inside eye	Solo	
2020	September 15−16	Hurricane Sally	Gulf Shores, Alabama, United States	Category 2 hurricane	968.2 mbar (28.59 inHg)	Inside eye	Solo	
2020	October 6−7	Hurricane Delta	Cancún, Quintana Roo, Mexico	Category 2 hurricane	—N/a	Inside eye	Solo	
2020	October 9	Hurricane Delta	Estherwood, Louisiana, United States	Category 2 hurricane	975.9 mbar (28.82 inHg)	Inside eye	Solo	
2020	October 26−27	Hurricane Zeta	Akumal, Quintana Roo, Mexico	Category 1 hurricane	979.2 mbar (28.92 inHg)	Inside eye	Solo	
2020	October 28	Hurricane Zeta	Bay St. Louis, Mississippi, United States	Category 2 hurricane	979.6 mbar (28.93 inHg)	Eyewall	Solo	
2021	August 16	Tropical Storm Fred	Apalachicola, Florida, United States	Tropical storm	—N/a	Inside eye	Solo	
2021	August 19	Hurricane Grace	Tulum, Quintana Roo, Mexico	Category 1 hurricane	978.4 mbar (28.89 inHg)	Inside eye	Erik Sereno	
2021	August 20–21	Hurricane Grace	La Guadalupe/El Encanto, Veracruz, Mexico	Category 3 hurricane	981.4 mbar (28.98 inHg)	Inside eye	Erik Sereno	
2021	August 29	Hurricane Ida	Houma, Louisiana, United States	Category 4 hurricane	966.6 mbar (28.54 inHg)	Eyewall	Chris Jackson	
2021	September 9	Hurricane Olaf	San José del Cabo, Baja California Sur, Mexico	Category 2 hurricane	976.7 mbar (28.84 inHg)	Inside eye	Solo	
2021	October 13	Hurricane Pamela	Mármol de Salcido, Sinaloa, Mexico	Category 1 hurricane	990.8 mbar (29.26 inHg)	Inside eye	Erik Sereno	
2021	October 25	Hurricane Rick	Ixtapa, Guerrero, Mexico	Category 2 hurricane	1,001.5 mbar (29.57 inHg)	Eyewall	Nicola Rustichelli	
2022	May 30	Hurricane Agatha	Mazunte, Oaxaca, Mexico	Category 2 hurricane	978.9 mbar (28.91 inHg)	Eyewall	Erik Sereno	
2022	September 19	Hurricane Fiona	Boca de Yuma, La Altagracia, Dominican Republic	Category 1 hurricane	979.9 mbar (28.94 inHg)	Inside eye	Solo	
2022	September 24	Hurricane Fiona	Glace Bay, Nova Scotia, Canada	Category 2 post-tropical cyclone	937.3 mbar (27.68 inHg)	Center	Solo	
2022	September 28	Hurricane Ian	Punta Gorda, Florida, United States	Category 4 hurricane	951.2 mbar (28.09 inHg)	Inside eye	Erik Fox	
2022	September 30	Hurricane Ian	McClellanville/Georgetown/Garden City, South Carolina, United States	Category 1 hurricane	979 mbar (28.9 inHg)	Inside eye	Erik Fox	
2022	October 3	Hurricane Orlene	Caimanero, Sinaloa, Mexico	Category 1 hurricane	991.3 mbar (29.27 inHg)	Inside eye	Erik Sereno	
2022	October 23	Hurricane Roslyn	Santa Cruz, Nayarit, Mexico	Category 3 hurricane	962.4 mbar (28.42 inHg)	Inside eye	Erik Sereno	
2022	November 2	Hurricane Lisa	Belize City, Belize District, Belize	Category 1 hurricane	986.9 mbar (29.14 inHg)	Inside eye	Solo	
2022	November 9−10	Hurricane Nicole	Stuart/Jensen Beach/Vero Beach, Florida, United States	Category 1 hurricane	985.6 mbar (29.10 inHg)	Inside eye	Kevin Conrad	
2023	August 30	Hurricane Idalia	Perry/Athena, Florida, United States	Category 3 hurricane	954.7 mbar (28.19 inHg)	Inside eye	Erik Fox, Parker Sigg	
2023	September 23	Tropical Storm Ophelia	Atlantic Beach/New Bern, North Carolina, United States	Tropical storm	—N/a	Inside eye	Solo	
2023	October 5	Typhoon Koinu	Kenting National Park, Pingtung County, Taiwan	Category 4 typhoon	—N/a	Inside eye	Anthony van Dyck	
2023	October 10	Hurricane Lidia	El Habal, Jalisco, Mexico	Category 4 hurricane	—N/a	Eyewall	Erik Sereno	
2024	July 4	Hurricane Beryl	Akumal/Puerto Aventuras, Quintana Roo, Mexico	Category 1 hurricane	988.5 mbar (29.19 inHg)	Inside eye	Erik Sereno	
2024	July 8	Hurricane Beryl	Matagorda, Texas, United States	Category 1 hurricane	980.1 mbar (28.94 inHg)	Inside eye	Erik Fox	
2024	August 5	Hurricane Debby	Steinhatchee, Florida, United States	Category 1 hurricane	982.2 mbar (29.00 inHg)	Inside eye	Solo	
2024	August 17	Hurricane Ernesto	Paget Parish, Bermuda	Category 1 hurricane	975.2 mbar (28.80 inHg)	Inside eye	Solo	
2024	August 28−29	Typhoon Shanshan	Makurazaki, Kagoshima, Japan	Category 2 typhoon	966 mbar (28.5 inHg)	Inside eye	James Reynolds	
2024	September 11	Hurricane Francine	Chauvin/Houma, Louisiana, United States	Category 2 hurricane	978.7 mbar (28.90 inHg)	Inside eye	Erik Fox	
2024	September 26−27	Hurricane Helene	Perry/Hampton Springs, Florida, United States	Category 4 hurricane	947 mbar (28.0 inHg)	Inside eye	Erik Fox	
2024	October 3	Typhoon Krathon	Cijin District, Kaohsiung, Taiwan	Category 1 typhoon	977.8 mbar (28.87 inHg)	Inside eye	Solo	
2024	October 9	Hurricane Milton	Sarasota, Florida, United States	Category 3 hurricane	959.7 mbar (28.34 inHg)	Inside eye	Erik Fox	
2024	October 31	Typhoon Kong-rey	Donghe, Taitung, Taiwan	Category 3 typhoon	—N/a	Inside eye	Solo	
2024	November 17	Typhoon Man-yi	Borlongan, Aurora, Philippines	Category 4 typhoon	951.8 mbar (28.11 inHg)	Inside eye	Solo	
2025	June 19	Hurricane Erick	San José Estancia Grande, Oaxaca, Mexico	Category 3 hurricane	975.7 mbar (28.81 inHg)	Eyewall	Solo	
2025	September 24	Typhoon Ragasa	Jiangcheng, Yangjiang, China	Category 3 typhoon	959 mbar (28.3 inHg)	Inside eye	Solo	
2025	October 28	Hurricane Melissa	Crawford, Saint Elizabeth Parish, Jamaica	Category 5 hurricane	926 mbar (27.3 inHg)	Inside eye	Solo	
2025	November 9	Typhoon Fung-wong	Baler, Aurora, Philippines	Category 3 typhoon	—N/a	Eyewall	Solo	
2026	July 10	Typhoon Bavi	Ishigaki, Okinawa, Japan	Category 1 typhoon	—N/a	Inside eye	Solo	
2026	August 15	Hurricane Lala	Papakōlea Beach, Hawaii, United States	Category 1 hurricane	—N/a	Eyewall	Solo	
2026	September 1	Tropical Storm Edouard	Cameron Parish, Louisiana, United States	Tropical storm	—N/a	Inside eye	Solo	
2026	September 28−29	Hurricane Polo	Las Barrancas, Baja California Sur, Mexico	Category 2 hurricane	—N/a	Eyewall	Solo	
2026	October 9	Hurricane Isaias	Fort Walton Beach/Okaloosa Island, Florida, United States	Category 2 hurricane	—N/a	Eyewall	Solo	

=== Typhoon Haiyan (2013) ===
On November 7, 2013, Morgerman flew with fellow chasers James Reynolds and Mark Thomas to Tacloban City in the Philippines to intercept one of the most powerful typhoons in the 21st century: Typhoon Haiyan.

They initially planned to ride out the storm south of the city, where the eye would ultimately make landfall; however, owing to a lack of sturdy shelters they opted to stay in Tacloban itself. They set up at a four-story concrete hotel about 26 ft (7.9 m) above sea level. The chasers came prepared with a week's-worth of food and water. Around 6:45 a.m. local time, the northern eyewall began battering Tacloban and winds rapidly became violent. Morgerman described the winds to have a "tornado-like quality" at times. Windows and doors at the hotel blew out and the roof was torn off. Trees in the region were completely defoliated. Around 7:50 a.m. a powerful storm surge swept through the city, with flood waters reaching a depth of 4 ft (1.2 m) at Morgerman's location.

The fast-rising nature of the water incited panic, residents sheltering at the hotel scrambled to the building's second floor and some broke windows to escape their rooms. Morgerman jumped into the water to help people get from flooding rooms to the stairs. Thomas severely injured his leg in the water while assisting trapped people.

Morgerman described the experience as traumatizing, witnessing the total devastation of Tacloban, bodies strewn across the streets, and "a city spiraling out of control". The crew was stuck in Tacloban for three days, eventually "escaping" on November 10 by which time the Philippine military arrived with relief supplies. Morgerman observed a minimum pressure of 959.9 mbar (28.35 inHg) in the eyewall of Haiyan. Extrapolating from his second measurement of 960.4 mbar (28.36 inHg), he estimated the central pressure to have been below 900 mbar (27 inHg).

On November 5, 2023, Morgerman returned to the Philippines and met with Reynolds and Thomas in Tacloban City a day later to commemorate the 10th anniversary of the cyclone hitting the city. They returned to the hotel that they rode the storm out in, and the hotel celebrated their return with a banner welcoming them back to the city. Morgerman revisited locations that were memorable to him from his time chasing Haiyan and reviewed the city's recovery since then. He also visited a burial site where hundreds of unidentified bodies were buried following the storm. The trio also attended a commemoration ceremony at the Tacloban City Convention Center for the cyclone's victims and met with locals who remembered them from their time in the city, and later attended a lunch banquet with President Bongbong Marcos. They also planted mangroves on an island the San Juanico Strait to "replace the ones lost in Haiyan". Morgerman also visited a family who he had met during the storm and whom he had helped rescue their eldest daughter out of the water.

=== Hurricane Odile (2014) ===
In September 2014, Morgerman intercepted Hurricane Odile in Cabo San Lucas, Mexico. Successfully entering the eye, he recorded a pressure of 943.1 mbar (27.85 inHg). Operational assessments of the hurricane's landfall intensity were taken into account for the release of catastrophe bonds funded by Wall Street and the World Bank. The bond system guaranteed a payout of $50 million for a storm with a pressure under 932 mbar (27.5 inHg); Odile's operational estimate was 930 mbar (27 inHg). However, his observations "upend[ed] the system" and the bonds were rescinded. This prevented vital recovery funds from being provided to the Government of Mexico. The hurricane caused extensive damage throughout Baja California Sur, with insured losses estimated at $1.2 billion. Industry experts later expressed concern over possible conflicts of interest with storm chasers and the catastrophe bonds.

=== Hurricane Dorian (2019) ===
On August 31, 2019, Morgerman flew to Marsh Harbour, in the Bahamas to intercept Category 5 Hurricane Dorian. Initially staging his chase in Treasure Cay, he ultimate chose to ride out the storm at Central Abaco Primary School—a designated concrete shelter—in Marsh Harbour. At 11:40 a.m. EDT on September 1, Morgerman reported board to be flying off the structures windows and children being wrapped in blankets for safety. After tweeting this information, contact with Morgerman lost for two days before he was able to contact the Weather Channel.

Around 2:00 p.m. EDT, Hurricane Dorian made landfall over the Abaco Islands with maximum sustained winds of 185 miles per hour (298 km/h), making it the strongest such storm on record in the Bahamas. The eyewall of Dorian proved exceptionally violent, battering the school with "the force of a thousand sledgehammers". He and others sheltering at the school held furniture against window shutters to prevent them from blowing in. The school was largely destroyed in the first half of the hurricane, forcing Morgerman and those sheltering inside to evacuate to a sturdier government building during the calm of the eye. During the eye, he recorded a pressure of 913.4 mbar (26.97 inHg), the lowest in his career. Hundreds of residents, many injured during the storm, sought refuge in the structure for the second half of the hurricane. After living in his car for two days, Morgerman arrived in Nassau by helicopter on September 3 before returning to the United States. He described Dorian as a "nuclear-grade hurricane" and "the most intense cyclone I’ve witnessed in 28 years of chasing".

=== Hurricane Melissa (2025) ===
On October 25, 2025, Morgerman flew to Montego Bay, Jamaica to intercept Category 5 Hurricane Melissa, his first chase in the country. Morgerman staged in Mandeville so that he could be central and near coastal locations as at the time it was unclear where Melissa might make landfall. Three days later Morgerman relocated to Crawford in Saint Elizabeth Parish, where he sheltered in a hotel, and he would ride out the storm there with a local family in the hotel's kitchen.

At 10:25 a.m., Morgerman sent his last tweet before landfall at approximately 1:00 p.m. in which wrote: "Frightening power. Whiteout. Roofs teaing off. Gusts like bombs going off. Painful ears. Praise the lord for solid concrete." [sic] Morgerman was not heard from for more than 24 hours until 8:03 p.m. the following day when Jamaican parliamentarian Floyd Green posted on Twitter that he had met Morgerman in Black River. An hour later, Morgerman posted to his own Twitter again in which he described how he rode out the storm in the hotel and that he was aware of two deaths in Crawford, one of a man who died from a heart attack in a school next door and a woman who drowned in storm surge on the beach. Morgerman wrote that Melissa was "perhaps the mightiest hurricane" he had witnessed and that through his meeting with Green that he had been inspired to "spread awareness of this catastrophe and get that aid flowing in". In the days after the hurricane Morgerman interviewed various survivors of the storm such as a man who survived by floating on a piece of Styrofoam and clinging to a tree, a woman who was thrown by the wind, and a couple who sheltered under a concrete table.

== Hurricane Man ==
In October 2018, UKTV announced a new television docuseries starring Morgerman to be aired on the network channel Dave. The eight-episode show, titled Hurricane Man, chronicles Morgerman's chases in 2018 across the world. A film crew accompanied him on his chases. The series is produced by ScreenDog Productions and distributed by BBC Studios. In addition to following Morgerman's experiences, the show also focuses on victims of the storms, sharing their experiences and how they're coping with its aftermath.

Morgerman acted more carefully during his chases with the film crew present, feeling responsibility for their safety. The show premiered in the United Kingdom on March 24, 2019, and June 12 in Australia on BBC Knowledge. The show debuted on September 15 in the United States on the Science Channel. The series' first two episodes focus on 2018's Category 5 Hurricane Michael and its effects in Panama City, Florida.
