= Manchester High School, Jamaica =

Manchester High School
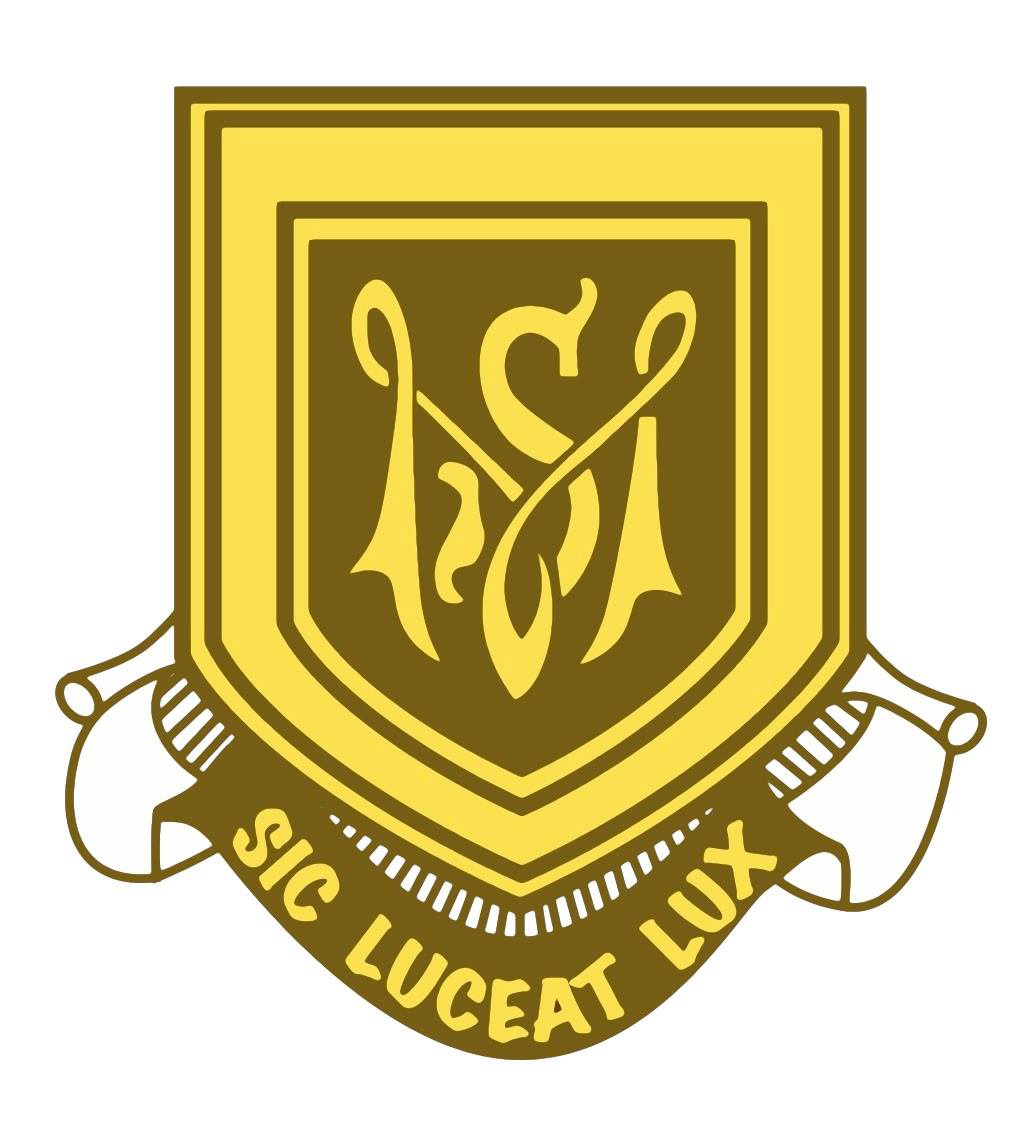
- Manchester High School crest

Location
- 4 Perth Rd. Mandeville, Jamaica; Jamaica; 18.037108°N 77.509273°W

Information
- School type: Secondary school
- Motto: Sic Luceat Lux (Let Your Light So Shine)
- Established: 1855
- Status: Open
- Authority: Ministry of Education
- Principal: Jasford Gabriel
- Teaching staff: 98
- Grades: 7 to 13
- Years offered: 11–19
- Gender: Coeducational
- Enrollment: 1898 (2021)
- Campus type: Rural
- Houses: Godfrey; Sherlock; Davidson; Gunter; German; Johns
- Colour: Brown Gold
- Song: Sic Luceat Lux (Let Your Light So Shine)
- Nickname: Chesta
- Website: Is not available

Manchester High School is a coeducational secondary school located at 4 Perth Road in the town of Mandeville, Jamaica.

== History ==
Manchester High School was established for the purpose of providing "a good middle class education" to boys and girls. Since portions of the current parish of Manchester were a part of Vere, the funds from the Vere Trust, a result of charitable donations from several individuals, were used in 1855 to establish several institutions.

Manchester Middle Grade and Elementary schools had separate sections for boys and girls and were conducted on premises adjacent to St. Mark's Anglican Church (Mandeville Parish Church) beginning April 20, 1861. Prior to this, the school was located on the lower storey of the Mandeville Court House, then on the premises of a private citizen. In 1952, the current site of the institution on Perth Road was acquired from the Anglican Church after the primary and middle schools moved to the campus currently known as Mandeville Primary and Junior High School and the school was officially opened in 1953.

=== Principals ===
- Christopher Garwood (1880 - 1883)
- Matthew Forbes "M.F." Johns (1883 - 1927)
- Sir Phillip Sherlock (1927 - 1929)
- Clarence Webb-Harris (1929 - 1943)
- Lewis Davidson (acting 1943)
- P. J. Eyre (1944 - 1945)
- John "J.C." Sleggs (1946 - 1959)
- Raymond "Gerry" German (1960 - 1966)
- Herbert Neita (acting 1966 - 1968)
- Ferdinand Gunter (1968 - 1981)
- Caswell Burton (1982 - 1991)
- Branford Gayle (1992 - 2004)
- Jasford Gabriel (2006 - PRESENT)
- Donnalyn King (2024)

== Accomplishments ==
=== Rhodes Scholars ===
- Chevano Baker (2019)

=== Inter-Secondary Schools Sports Association (ISSA) Boys and Girls Championships ===
==== Girls' Championships ====
- 1961
- 1994
- 1995

=== Headley Cup ===
- 2013
- 2019
- 2024

=== TVJ's All Together Sing ===
- 2012
- 2015
- 2022

=== Schools Challenge Quiz ===
- 1976
- 1982

=== ISSA Basketball ===
- 2014 Boys' Under-14 Central Championship
- 2014 Boys' Under-14 All-Island Championship
- 2022 Boys' Under-19 Central Championship

== Clash of titans ==
Clash of titans is the arguably largest inter-form quiz competition in the island. It is a prime staple of the Manchester High School recruitment system for the school’s quiz team. It was founded by Mr. Stallone Francis, the school’s quiz coach.

=== Winners ===
Fastest team in the minutes section

Grizzlies (2023) - Tiana Lawson, Daveen Johnson, Syrando Edwards, Jaheem Peart

Delta Force (2024) - Abigail Swaby, Brittany Chin-Quee, Nashari Miller, Zhonae Francis

Brainwave Brigade (2025) - Rickayla Henry, Kejaun Daley, Nickardo Dennis

F.R.I.E.N.D.S., Formerly F.R.E.I.N.D.S., (2026) - Kyle Dale (Captain), Natajanaé Callum, Rjay Swaby, Christophe Anderson

== Notable alumni ==
=== Politics and law ===
- Christopher Tufton, Member of Parliament for Saint Catherine West Central (Jamaica Parliament constituency), Minister of Health and Wellness

=== Arts and culture ===
- Sheryl Lee Ralph, Jamaican-American actress, singer, author and activist
- Anton Phillips, Jamaican-born British actor
- Lila Iké, reggae singer and songwriter
- Luciano, Roots Reggae singer and songwriter
- Nigel Staff, songwriter, producer and composer

=== Sports ===
- Lorraine Fenton, sprinter, 400m national record holder and Olympic silver medallist
- Sherone Simpson, sprinter, 4 × 100m relay Olympic champion
- Nesta Carter, sprinter, 4 × 100m relay Olympic champion
- Omar McLeod, hurdler, 110m hurdles national record holder and Olympic champion
- Elaine Thompson Herah, sprinter, 100m, 200m Olympic champion
- Natoya Goule, middle-distance runner, 800m national record holder and Olympian
- Sheri-Ann Brooks, sprinter, Commonwealth Games champion, Olympian
- Chanice Porter, long jump athlete and Olympian
- Jason Johnson, Major League Soccer and member of the Reggae Boyz
- Colin Heron, first-class cricket player
