= Kimour Bruce =

Jamaican sprinter

Kimour Bruce (born September 6, 1986, in Mandeville, Jamaica), is a Jamaican sprinter who specializes in the 60 and 100 meters in Division II and attended Lincoln University of Missouri, where he attained the honor of being a twelve time All-American. Bruce was undefeated in the 60 and the 100 meters during 2010 to 2011, from his junior to senior year.

During his high school years, Bruce attended Porus High School and Camperdown High School in Jamaica. Bruce best performance in high school came in his final year of Camperdown High School in 2006 at the VMBS Boys and Girls track and field championship, where Bruce was placed 2nd behind Remaldo Rose in the 100m in a time of 10.55.

During his college career Bruce made a name for himself by becoming the first Division II sprinter to defend both his 60 and 100 meter titles. Bruce is also the MIAA Indoor conference record holder in the 60 meters, in a time of 6:65 which was run at Warrensburg Missouri in 2011. Bruce first title came in 2010 when he won the indoor National Collegiate Athletic Association (NCAA) Championship in the 60 meter in a time 6.66. A few months later at the NCAA outdoor championship, Bruce also capped his first 100m title, in a time of 10.37.

Event	Personal best times	Venue	Date
60 m	6.62	NCAA Division II Indoor championship Albuquerque, New Mexico	March 11, 2011
100 m	10.22	NCAA Division II Outdoor Championship San Angelo, Texas	May 22, 2009
200 m	21.18	NCAA Division II Outdoor Championship San Angelo, Texas	May 23, 2009
