= Spur Tree =

Community in Manchester Parish, Jamaica

- Community
- Jamaican Patois: Spuurchrii
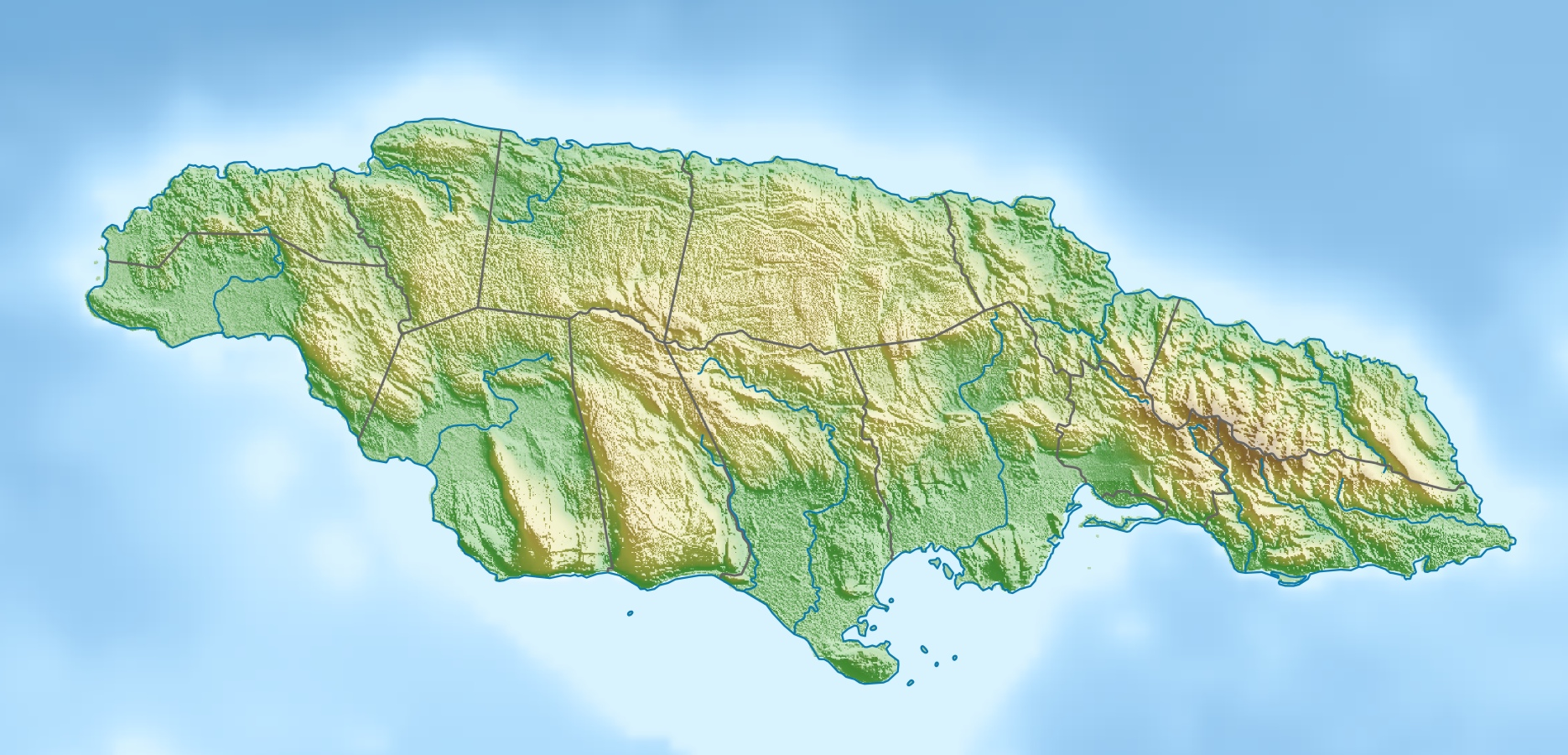
- Location of Spur Tree in Jamaica
- Coordinates: 17°59′43″N 77°33′35″W
- Country: Jamaica
- Parish: Manchester
- County: Middlesex
- Constituency: Manchester North Western Manchester Southern
- Electoral Division: Spur Tree, Newport

Government
  - Body: Manchester Municipal Corporation
  - Councillor: Ryan Peart (PNP)
- Elevation: 801 m (2,628 ft)

Population (2022)
  - Total: 4,453
- Time zone: UTC−05:00

Spur Tree is a community and electoral division located in the parish of Manchester, Jamaica, situated atop Spur Tree Hill near the border with Saint Elizabeth. The area functions as a main transport and commercial route, a role highlighted by its location on the primary thoroughfare connecting the two parishes.

The community's local economy was strongly associated with the food manufacturing company Spur Tree Spices Jamaica Limited.

== Geography ==
Spur Tree is situated atop the physical feature known as Spur Tree Hill in southern Manchester. The community, which sits at an elevation of approximately 477 metres (1,565 ft), is defined by the winding Spur Tree Hill Road. This thoroughfare is recognized as a major north-south transport artery, linking the parish of Manchester with Saint Elizabeth at the parish boundary. The road's strategic position makes the area a commercial and transit hub.

== Neighbouring communities ==
The Spur Tree area includes contiguous residential settlements that are administratively distinct. The communities of French Park, with a population of 1,852, and Elleston (also known as Elliston) immediately border the commercial centre of Spur Tree. While the areas are locally considered part of the greater Spur Tree community, these residential sections are considered separate by the Government of Jamaica.

Other surrounding areas include: Newport, with a population of 5,220 as of 2022, Mandeville, Hatfield, Knockpatrick, and Alligator Pond.

== Demographics ==
According to the latest available census data from the Statistical Institute of Jamaica (STATIN), Spur Tree had a total population of 4,453 residents and 1,182 dwellings as of 2022. The area's population figures primarily reflect the official administrative boundaries rather than the larger contiguous residential areas. The nearby community of Newport had a population of 5,220 in the same census year.

== Governance and politics ==
Spur Tree is represented at both the local and national levels of government.

At the local level, the community is administered by the Manchester Municipal Corporation and falls within the Spur Tree Electoral Division. The local representative for the division is Councillor Ryan Peart of the PNP, who was elected during the 2024 local government elections. Peart won the seat by securing 1,395 votes, defeating his opponent, JLP candidate Lincoln Holloway, who received 874 votes, giving him a winning margin of 521 votes.

For national representation, the area forms part of the Manchester North Western constituency. The sitting Member of Parliament (MP) for the constituency is Mikael Phillips, also of the PNP, who has consistently retained his seat. In the 2025 General Election, Phillips secured the victory in the three-way race with 7,025 votes, defeating the JLP candidate, Damion Young, who received 5,880 votes, and Tretia Stewart Angus of the JPP, who received 38 votes.

== Economic History ==
The economy of the Spur Tree area was closely linked to the food manufacturing and export company, Spur Tree Spices Jamaica Limited, which had been established in the area in 2006, and was later listed on the Junior Market of the Jamaica Stock Exchange (JSE). Spur Tree Spices' operations, which included production and export, represented a significant commercial presence in the community. The company is now located in Kingston, Jamaica.

== Culture and landmarks ==
The contiguous residential area of French Park and Elleston contains several important institutions and landmarks that serve the greater Spur Tree community:

Ferguson Primary School is an educational institution located in French Park, Manchester. The French Park New Testament Church of God is the primary religious institution in the area.
