= Colin Heron =

Jamaican cricketer (1924–2010)

Personal information
- Full name: Colin Hubert Heron
- Born: 12 November 1924; Mandeville, Middlesex County, Jamaica
- Died: 19 March 2010 (aged 85); Kingston, Ontario, Canada
- Batting: Right-handed
- Bowling: Right-arm fast-medium

Domestic team information
- Years: Team
- 1958–1960: Cheshire
- 1961/62: British Guiana

Career statistics
Competition	First-class
Matches	1
Runs scored	15
Batting average	–
100s/50s	–/–
Top score	15*
Balls bowled	204
Wickets	2
Bowling average	50.50
5 wickets in innings	–
10 wickets in match	–
Best bowling	2/54
Catches/stumpings	–/–
- Source: Cricinfo, 26 February 2019

Colin Hubert Heron (12 November 1924 – 19 March 2010) was a Jamaican first-class cricketer.

Heron was born at Mandeville in Jamaica to Charles Hubert Heron and his wife, Leila Augusta Harty. He was educated in Mandeville at Manchester High School. After completing his education, Heron became an accountant for Deloitte Haskins & Sells. He lived in England at some point, appearing in minor counties cricket for Cheshire, making six appearances the Minor Counties Championship; three each in 1958 and 1960. He moved to British Guiana shortly after and appeared for the British Guiana cricket team in one first-class cricket match in October 1961 against Trinidad at Rose Hall. Batting once in the match, Heron ended British Guiana's first-innings total of 501 all out unbeaten on 15. With his right-arm fast-medium bowling he took 2 wickets in Trinidad's first-innings, dismissing Marcus Minshall and Pascall Roberts to finish with figures of 2 for 54 from 21 overs; Trinidad followed-on in their second-innings, with Heron going wicketless, conceding 47 runs from 13 overs.

He married Cicely Indranee in June 1967, with the couple having two children. Heron later emigrated to Canada, where he died at St. Mary's of the Lake Hospital in Kingston, Ontario in March 2010, following a short battle with cancer.
