= Yaadcore =

Jamaican DJ (born 1989)

- Born: Rory Cha; 1989 (age 36–37); Jamaica
- Occupation: DJ
- Musical career
- Genres: reggae
- Label: 12 Yaad Records

Rory Cha (born 1989), known by his stage name Yaadcore is a Jamaican DJ, singer and music producer from Mandeville.

== Life and career ==
Rory grew up in Mandeville where his father, who was also a DJ, owned a sound system called Love People International. He began his career as a DJ at age of 14 in 2003. Yaadcore has been associated with reggae musician Protoje as his touring DJ. He is also the co-founder of Dubwise Jamaica, a reggae sound system and co-founder of reggae record label 12 Yaad Records. He has performed at various events in Jamaica and abroad. In 2022, he released his debut album Reggaeland under his own record label.
