= Manchester North Western (Jamaica Parliament constituency) =

Parliamentary constituency of Jamaica

- Constituency for the Parliament of Jamaica
- District: Manchester Parish, Jamaica

Current constituency
- Created: 1966
- Party: PNP
- Member: Mikael Phillips

Manchester North Western is a parliamentary constituency represented in the House of Representatives of the Jamaican Parliament. It elects one Member of Parliament (MP) by the first past the post system of election. It is located in Manchester Parish. The current MP is Mikael Phillips.

== 2025 General Election ==
In the 2025 General Election, PNP candidate Mikael Phillips successfully retained the seat. He secured the victory in the three-way contest with 7,025 votes, defeating JLP candidate Damion Young (5,880 votes) and Tretia Stewart Angus of the JPP (38 votes), thereby gaining a majority of 1,145 votes.

== Electoral Divisions ==
Manchester North Western is number 19 on the map.

The Manchester North Western constituency is composed of four (4) electoral divisions:

- Spur Tree
- Johns Hall
- Mile Gully
- New Green
