= Alfred George Nash =

Jamaican civil engineer (1853–1930)

Alfred George Nash FRSE (1853–23 December 1930) was a Jamaican civil engineer of Scots descent who held several legislative roles there.

== Life ==
He was born in Mandeville, Jamaica in 1853. He was educated at St George's College in Kingston. He was traveled to Scotland to study engineering at the University of Edinburgh, graduating with a BSc around 1873. He was working in Britain as a civil engineer in the 1870s returning to Jamaica in 1882. He was a Member of the Legislative Council of Jamaica.

In 1897 he was elected a Fellow of the Royal Society of Edinburgh. His proposers were Alexander Crum Brown, Cargill Gilston Knott, Peter Guthrie Tait and Andrew Jamieson.

He died on 23 December 1930. He is buried in St Mark's Anglican Churchyard in Mandeville, Jamaica.
