= Chamela =

Town in Jalisco, Mexico

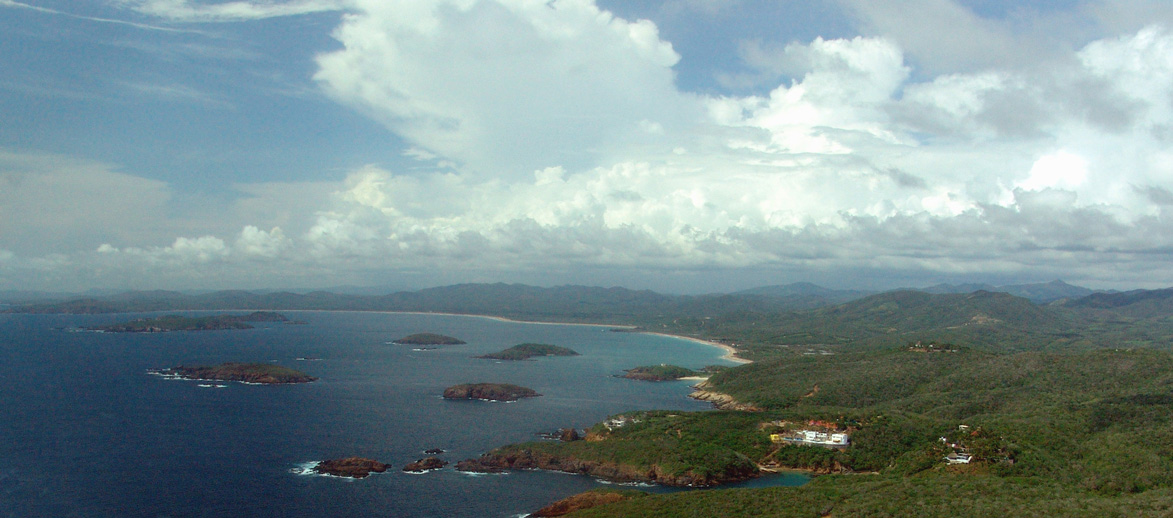
Aerial view of Island Bay, looking northward

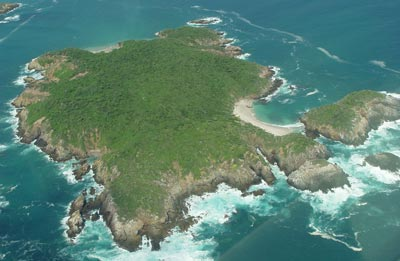
Cocina Island

Chamela is a small town in the state of Jalisco, on the west coast of Mexico. The town of Chamela sits on the south end of a bay called the Bahía de Chamela, or "Chamela Bay", on Federal Highway 200. San Mateo and Punta Pérula are the two other towns on the bay. It is 8 miles north of the better known resort of Careyes.

Chamela was a port during Spanish colonial times, often visited by galleons. Ruins of a colonial era fortification, built by Pedro de Alvarado, still remain.

Also known as Island Bay, Chamela's islands were declared a protected nature sanctuary by the Mexican government on April 9, 2001. It is a mostly undeveloped tourism destination, although several companies have announced plans to develop resorts on the bay.

A project to develop a marina on the bay's north point (Punta Perula) has been superseded by Roberto Hernandez Ramirez plan to develop a marina in Careyes, approximately 8 miles to the south.

In 2015, the town was largely destroyed by Hurricane Patricia.
