= Hurricane Patricia =

Category 5 Pacific hurricane in 2015

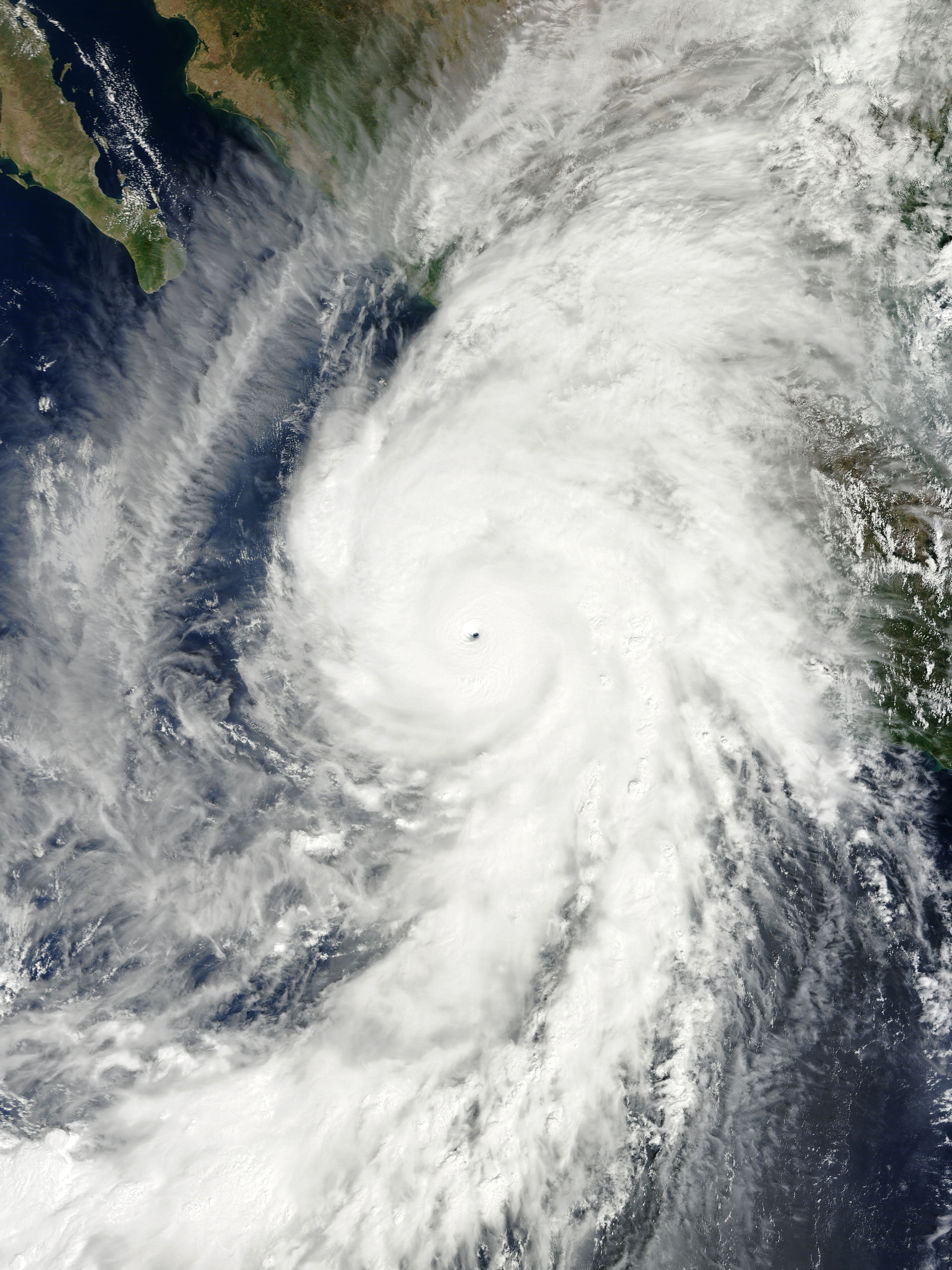
- Patricia shortly after its record peak intensity while approaching Western Mexico on October 23

Meteorological history
- Formed: October 20, 2015
- Dissipated: October 24, 2015

Category 5 major hurricane
- 1-minute sustained (SSHWS/NWS)
- Highest winds: 215 mph (345 km/h) (Record highest worldwide by maximum sustained wind)
- Lowest pressure: 872 mbar (hPa); 25.75 inHg (Record low in Western Hemisphere; second-lowest worldwide)

Overall effects
- Fatalities: 13 total
- Damage: $484 million (2015 USD)
- Areas affected: Western Mexico, Southern United States (Texas)
- IBTrACS
- Part of the 2015 Pacific hurricane season

Hurricane Patricia was the most powerful tropical cyclone on record worldwide in terms of maximum sustained winds. It was also the second-most intense on record worldwide in terms of pressure, with a minimum atmospheric pressure of 872 mbar (25.75 inHg), just behind Typhoon Tip's 870 mbar (25.69 inHg). Originating from a sprawling disturbance near the Gulf of Tehuantepec, south of Mexico, in mid-October 2015, Patricia was first classified as a tropical depression on October 20. Initial development was slow, with only modest strengthening within the first day of its classification. The system later became a tropical storm and was named Patricia, the twenty-fourth named storm of the 2015 Pacific hurricane season. Exceptionally favorable environmental conditions fueled explosive intensification on October 22. A well-defined eye developed within an intense central dense overcast and Patricia grew from a tropical storm to a Category 5 hurricane in just 24 hours—a near-record pace. On October 23, the hurricane achieved its record peak intensity with maximum sustained winds of 215 mph (345 km/h). (Note: All winds are one-minute sustained unless otherwise noted.) (Note: The figures for maximum sustained winds and position estimates are rounded to the nearest 5 units (knots, miles, or kilometers), following the convention used in the National Hurricane Center's products. Direct wind observations are rounded to the nearest whole number. Atmospheric pressures are listed to the nearest millibar and nearest hundredth of an inch of mercury.) This made it the most intense tropical cyclone on record in the Western Hemisphere and the strongest globally in terms of one-minute maximum sustained winds. As Patricia neared its peak strength, the cyclone began to turn east-northeast towards Mexico.

Late on October 23, dramatic weakening ensued and Patricia made landfall near Cuixmala, Jalisco, with winds of 150 mph (240 km/h). This still made it the strongest landfalling Pacific hurricane on record at the time, until it was surpassed by Hurricane Otis in 2023. Patricia continued to weaken extremely quickly, faster than it had intensified, as it interacted with the mountainous terrain of Mexico. Within 24 hours of moving ashore, Patricia weakened into a tropical depression and dissipated soon thereafter, late on October 24.

The precursor to Patricia produced widespread flooding rains in Central America. Hundreds of thousands of people were directly affected by the storm, mostly in Guatemala. At least six fatalities were attributed to the event: four in El Salvador, one in Guatemala, and one in Nicaragua. Torrential rains extended into southeastern Mexico, with areas of Quintana Roo and Veracruz reporting accumulations in excess of 19.7 in (500 mm). Damage in Chetumal reached MX$1.4 billion (US$85.3 million). (Note: All monetary totals are in 2015 values of their respective currency unless otherwise noted.)

As a tropical cyclone, Patricia's effects in Mexico were tremendous; however, the affected areas were predominantly rural, lessening the number of people directly impacted. Violent winds tore roofs from structures and stripped coastal areas of their vegetation. Preliminary assessments indicated hundreds of homes were destroyed; seven fatalities were linked to the hurricane directly or indirectly, including one during evacuations. Total damage from Patricia was estimated to be at least $462.8 million (2015 USD); the damage in Mexico alone was estimated to be in excess of MX$5.4 billion (US$325 million), with agriculture and infrastructure comprising the majority of losses. Flooding partially associated with remnant moisture from Patricia inflicted US$52.5 million in damage across Southern Texas.

== Meteorological history ==
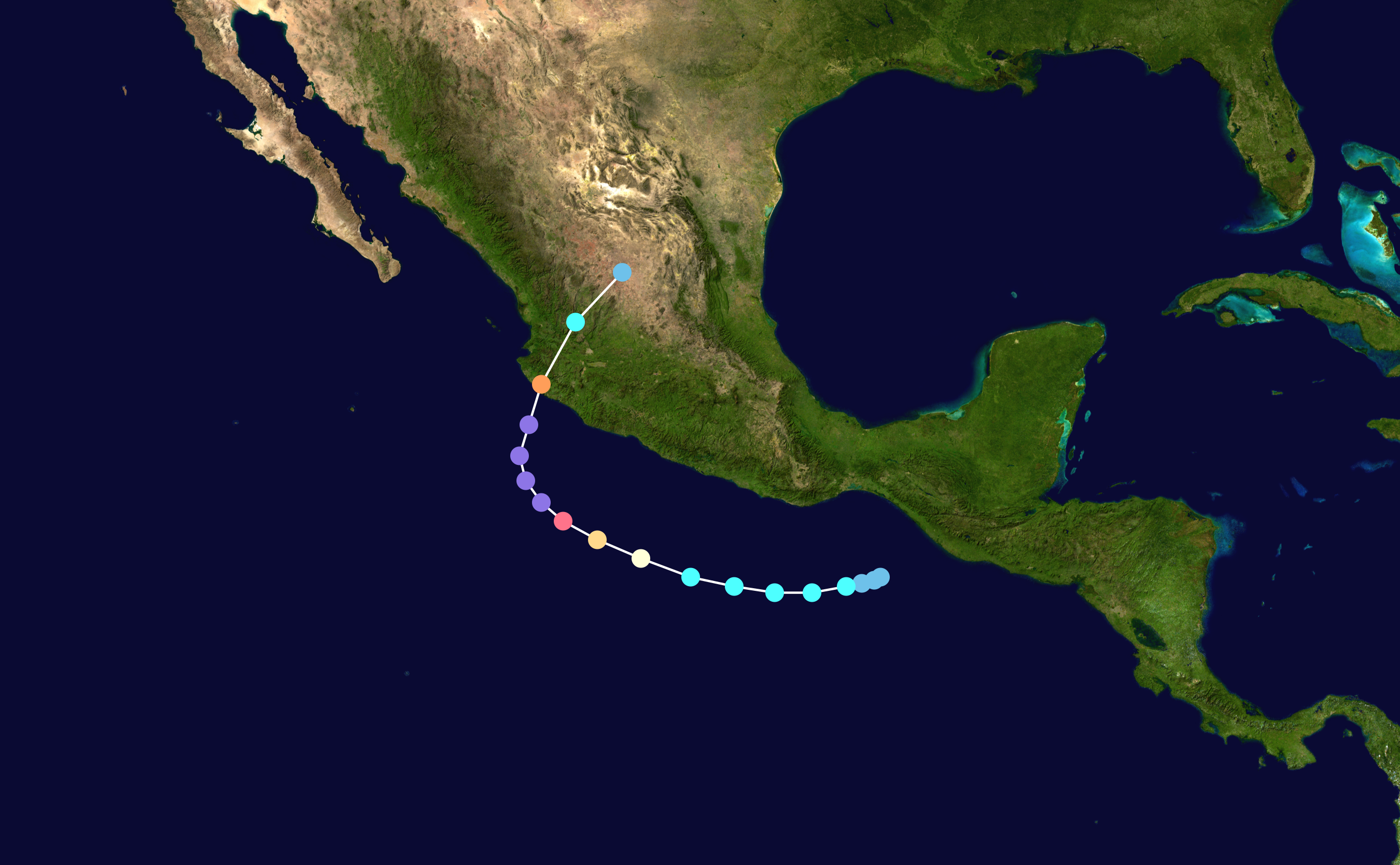
Map plotting the storm's track and intensity, according to the Saffir–Simpson scale Map key Saffir–Simpson scale Tropical depression (≤38 mph, ≤62 km/h) Tropical storm (39–73 mph, 63–118 km/h) Category 1 (74–95 mph, 119–153 km/h) Category 2 (96–110 mph, 154–177 km/h) Category 3 (111–129 mph, 178–208 km/h) Category 4 (130–156 mph, 209–251 km/h) Category 5 (≥157 mph, ≥252 km/h) Unknown Storm type Tropical cyclone Subtropical cyclone Extratropical cyclone, remnant low, tropical disturbance, or monsoon depression

On October 11, 2015, an area of disturbed weather traversed Central America and emerged over the eastern Pacific Ocean. The disturbance moved slowly over the next few days, later merging with a tropical wave on October 15. The merger of these systems and the effects of a concurrent Tehuantepec gap wind event spurred the formation of a broad area of low pressure. This feature gradually consolidated and became a tropical depression shortly after 00:00 UTC on October 20; at this time the depression was situated roughly 205 mi (330 km) south-southeast of Salina Cruz, Mexico. A mid-level ridge to the north steered the depression generally west and later pulled it north along an arcing path.

Development was initially slowed by locally cooler sea surface temperatures and dry air, and the depression became Tropical Storm Patricia later that day. Once clear of the unfavorable region, Patricia traversed anomalously warm waters within an environment exceptionally conducive to rapid intensification. Dramatic strengthening began late on October 21 and continued through October 23. Patricia reached hurricane strength shortly after 00:00 UTC on October 22, featuring prominent outflow, well-defined banding features, and a developing eye. Data from hurricane hunters investigating the cyclone indicated Patricia to have reached Category 4 status on the Saffir–Simpson hurricane wind scale by 18:00 UTC.

Satellite animation of Patricia weakening considerably before making landfall on October 23

By the early hours of October 23, a clear northward turn took place followed by acceleration northeast. A solid ring of −130 °F (−90 °C) cloud tops surrounded the hurricane's 12 mi (19 km) wide eye and signaled its intensification into a Category 5 hurricane. In a 24-hour time span, Patricia's maximum sustained winds increased by 120 mph (195 km/h), the fastest such intensification in any hurricane observed by the National Hurricane Center (NHC). The hurricane reached its peak intensity at around 12:00 UTC on October 23, with estimated winds around 215 mph (346 km/h) and a barometric pressure of 872 mbar (hPa; 25.75 inHg); these values are based upon continued intensification after a Hurricane Hunter mission into the storm six hours prior. In the NHC's report on Patricia, it is noted that the hurricane may have surpassed Typhoon Tip as the strongest tropical cyclone ever observed, but lack of direct observations at the time of its peak prevents analysis of such.

Later on October 23, rapid weakening ensued as an eyewall replacement cycle took shape and wind shear increased. In the five hours up until landfall in Mexico, Patricia weakened at an unprecedented rate while still over water. However, upon moving ashore around 23:00 UTC near Cuixmala, Jalisco, it remained a strong Category 4 hurricane, with sustained winds of 150 mph (240 km/h) and an analyzed pressure of 932 mbar (hPa; 27.52 inHg). This made Patricia the most intense landfalling Pacific hurricane on record, until Hurricane Otis surpassed it in October 2023. Once onshore, the high terrain of the Sierra Madre mountains accelerated Patricia's weakening. The low- and mid-level circulations of the tropical cyclone decoupled, with the latter accelerating northeast, and Patricia dissipated on October 24 over central Mexico, less than 18 hours after moving ashore.

=== Records ===
Most intense tropical cyclones
	Cyclone	Season	Basin	Pressure	
	Cyclone	Season	Basin	hPa	inHg
1	Tip	1979	W. Pacific	870	25.7
2	Patricia	2015	E. Pacific	872	25.7
3	June	1975	W. Pacific	875	25.8
3	Nora	1973	W. Pacific	875	25.8
5	Forrest	1983	W. Pacific	876	25.9
6	Ida	1958	W. Pacific	877	25.9
7	Rita	1978	W. Pacific	878	26.0
8	Kit	1966	W. Pacific	880	26.0
8	Vanessa	1984	W. Pacific	880	26.0
10	Nancy	1961	W. Pacific	882	26.4
10	Wilma	2005	Atlantic	882	26.4
Source: JMA Typhoon Best Track Analysis. National Hurricane Center Tropical Cyclone Reports.

Hurricane Patricia set multiple records for maximum strength, rate of intensification, and rate of weakening throughout its relatively short existence. With maximum sustained winds of 215 mph (345 km/h) and a minimum pressure of 872 mbar (hPa; 25.75 inHg), Patricia is the most intense tropical cyclone ever observed in the Western Hemisphere. In terms of central pressure, it is also the second-most intense tropical cyclone ever recorded worldwide, just shy of Typhoon Tip in 1979 which had a minimum pressure of 870 mbar (hPa; 25.69 inHg).

Patricia's one-minute maximum sustained winds ranked as the highest ever reliably observed or estimated in a tropical cyclone, surpassing Typhoon Haiyan of 2013. The magnitude of Patricia's rapid intensification is among the fastest ever observed. In a 24-hour period, 06:00–06:00 UTC October 22–23, its maximum sustained winds increased from 85 mph (140 km/h) to 205 mph (335 km/h), a record increase of 120 mph (195 km/h). During the same period, Patricia's central pressure fell by 95 mbar (hPa; 2.81 inHg). Despite record over-water weakening prior to striking Mexico, Patricia became the most intense Pacific hurricane to make landfall, with a pressure of 932 mbar (hPa; 27.52 inHg), until Otis surpassed this intensity with a pressure of 929 mbar (hPa; 27.43 inHg).

=== Forecast errors ===
The rapid intensification of Patricia was well-anticipated but poorly forecasted. Meteorologists at the NHC indicated the possibility of such in the system's first advisory as a tropical depression. They noted the only inhibiting factor would be how quickly the storm could organize an inner core. Just before the onset of rapid intensification, the agency was unable to utilize the Statistical Hurricane Intensity Prediction Scheme rapid intensification guidance due to technical errors. This likely contributed to even greater errors in the agency's forecast. Initial forecasts were consistently conservative with intensity and dramatic strengthening was not explicitly shown until rapid intensification was already underway.

== Preparations ==
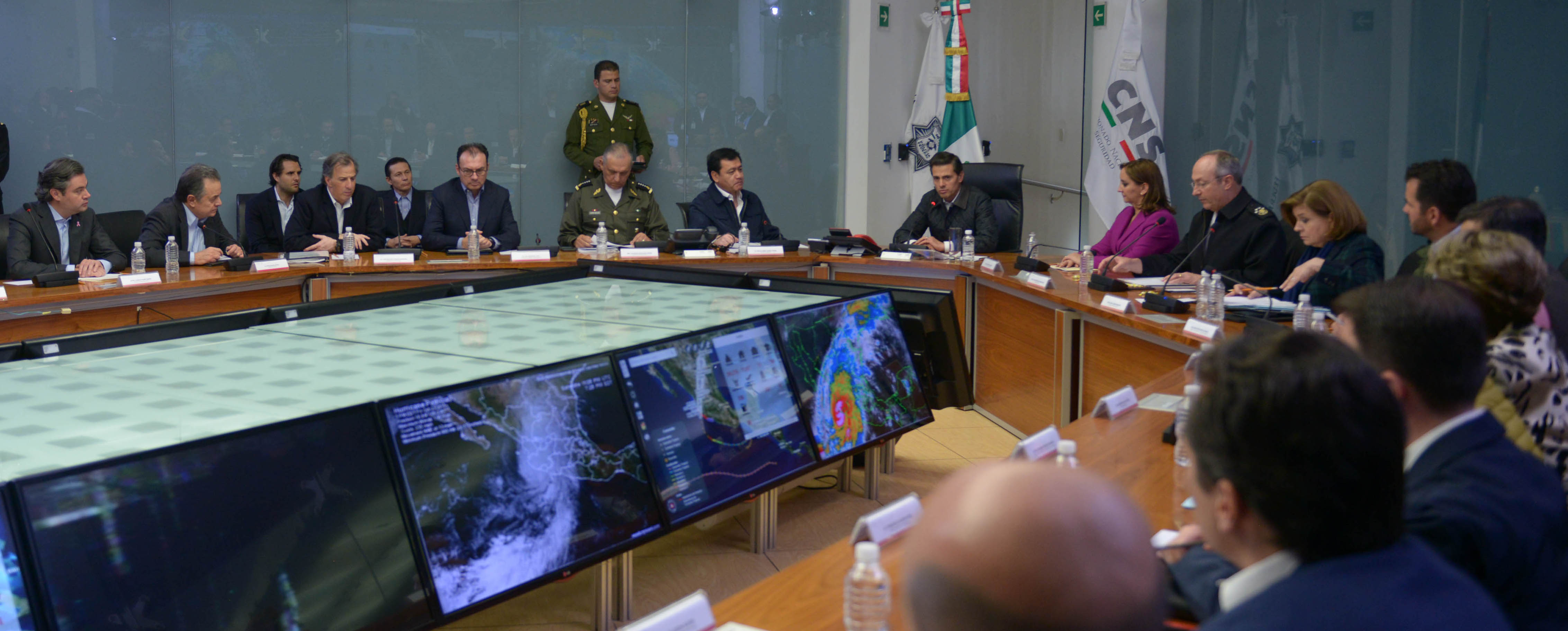
President Enrique Peña Nieto meets with cabinet members to discuss Hurricane Patricia on October 23

Before Hurricane Patricia arrived, the Government of Mexico issued multiple watches and warnings for coastal communities. A hurricane watch was first raised at 09:00 UTC on October 21, encompassing areas of Michoacán, Colima, and Jalisco. A tropical storm watch also covered portions of Guerrero. As Patricia intensified, the government issued a hurricane warning for areas between Cabo Corrientes, Jalisco, and Punta San Telmo, Michoacán; a tropical storm warning supplemented this for areas farther north and east. The hurricane warning was extended northward to include areas south of San Blas, Nayarit, on October 23. Once the storm moved inland and the threat of damaging winds diminished, these warnings were gradually discontinued on October 24.

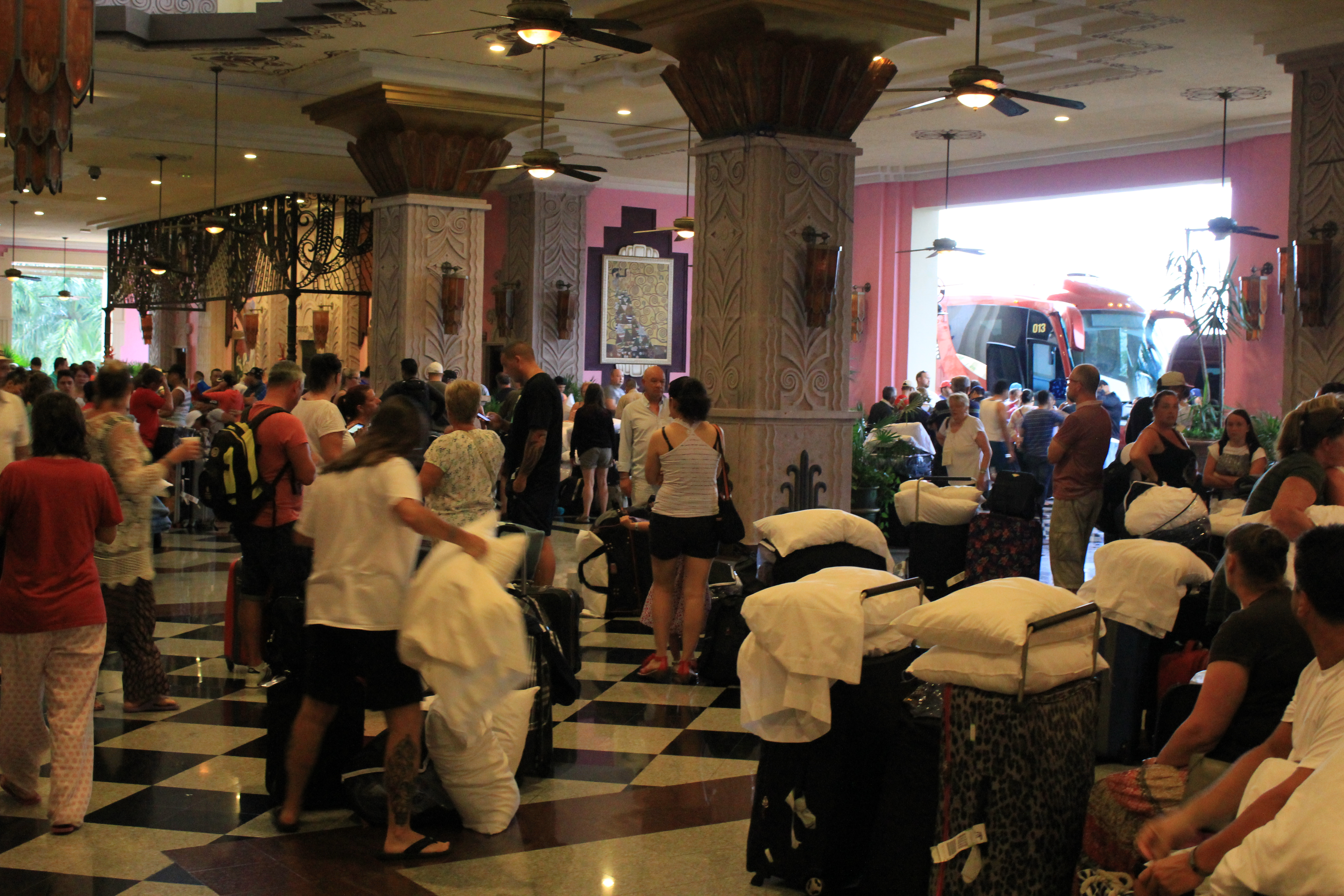
Evacuation from hotel Riu Vallarta on the morning before Hurricane Patricia made landfall

Following Patricia's upgrade to Category 5 status, the National Hurricane Center called the storm "potentially catastrophic", a source of criticism and praise from various media. Citing the relatively limited damage and loss of life, some outlets, including the Associated Press, claimed the agency was exaggerating the danger posed by the storm. However, most outlets praised them for effectively communicating the dire threat and potentially saving lives from an exceptionally powerful hurricane.

Across Michoacán, Colima, Jalisco, and Nayarit, 1,782 shelters were opened on October 22 with a collective capacity of 258,000 people. Officials in Manzanillo began distributing sandbags during the afternoon of October 22. Schools across Guerrero and Jalisco suspended activities for October 22 and 23, respectively. Civil protection officials planned to evacuate roughly 50,000 people from Colima, Jalisco, and Nayarit. To expedite the process, 2 aircraft and 600 buses were used to shuttle evacuees. Ultimately, 8,500 people evacuated prior to the storm's arrival, including 2,600 in Cabo Corrientes. One person died during an evacuation in Jalisco. Roughly 25,000 personnel from the Mexican Army, Navy, and Federal Police were deployed preemptively. More than 500 Red Cross volunteers were on standby. The Mexican Red Cross prepositioned food for 3,500 families.

Approximately 30,000 kg (66,000 lb) of aid was prepositioned in Colima for distribution after the hurricane's passage. The Electric Federal Commission dispatched 2,500 crewmen, 152 cranes, 15 all-terrain vehicles, 4 helicopters, and 84 generators to cope with potential power outages. Mexican authorities received praise for effectively carrying out emergency preparations.

== Impact from precursor disturbance ==
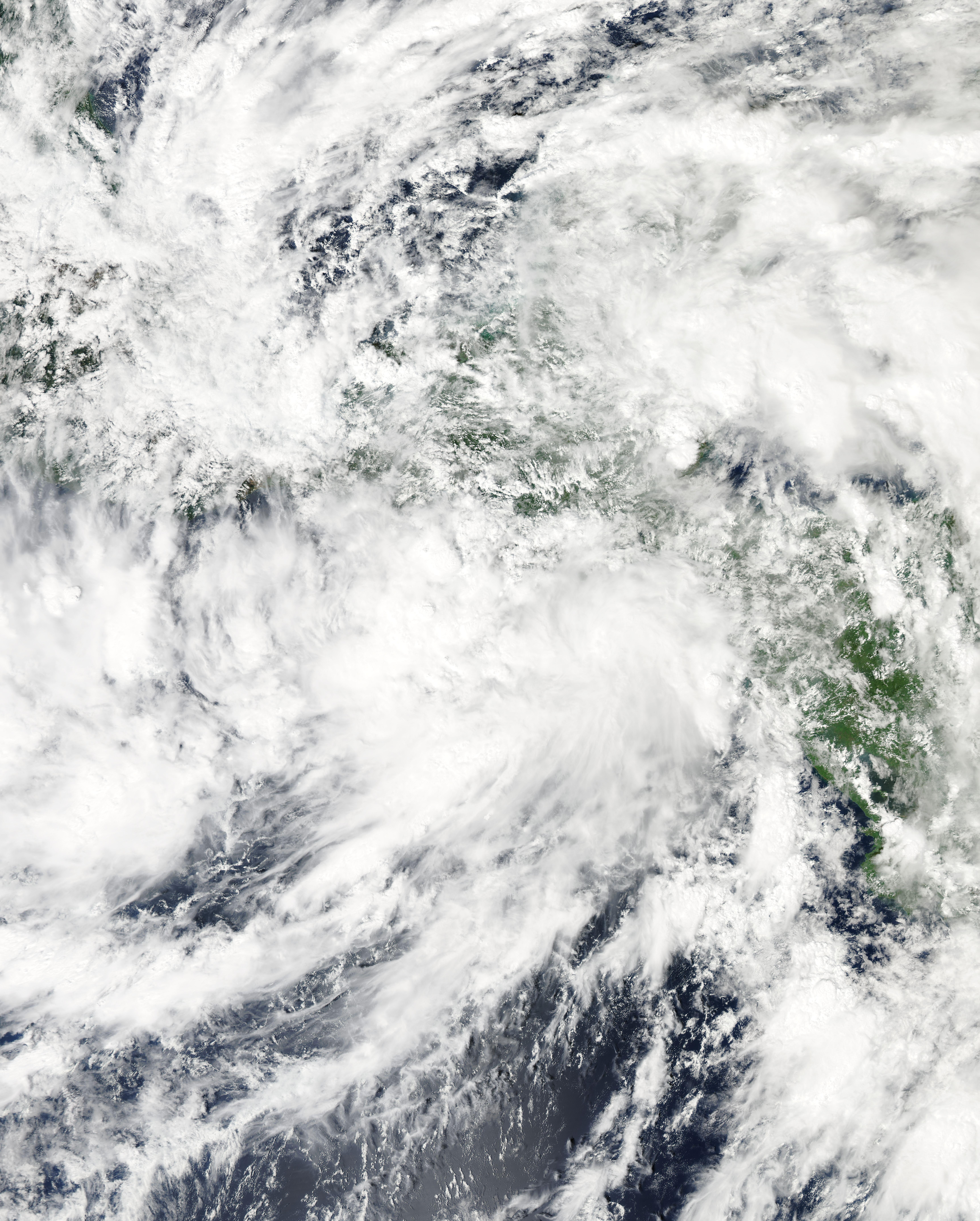
The sprawling precursor to Hurricane Patricia over Central America on October 17

The precursor of Patricia was a large and sprawling system that affected much of Central America with heavy rain for several days. Rainfall was enhanced by the presence of multiple systems, including a tropical wave and a second disturbance over the Caribbean Sea. One person was killed in the Alta Verapaz Department and approximately 2,100 people required evacuation across Guatemala. A total of 442 homes and 28,200 ha (70,000 acres) of crops were damaged while roughly 223,000 people were affected by flooding. Government officials deployed emergency teams and Q40 million (US$5.22 million) was available for relief operations. In nearby El Salvador between 160 and 185 mm (6.3 and 7.3 in) of rain fell, causing similar floods. Dozens of homes were affected and four people were killed. The Goascorán River overflowed its banks twice in two days, inundating surrounding communities. Owing to widespread flooding, authorities suspended school activities across the country on October 19. In Nicaragua, a landslide buried four miners in Bonanza; one died while the others were rescued. The Ulúa River in Honduras over-topped its banks for the first time in 17 years on October 18, prompting the evacuation of more than 200 people. Furthermore, flooding damaged 10 homes in Jacó, Costa Rica.

The aforementioned rains extended into Southwestern and Northeastern Mexico, falling from October 18–20; precipitation was enhanced by another tropical disturbance over the northwestern Caribbean Sea. Portions of Quintana Roo saw their most intense rainfall event on record, with 502 mm (19.8 in) observed in Chetumal. This surpassed the previous record of 450 mm (18 in) during Hurricane Wilma in 2005. Flooding affected approximately 1,500 homes in the city, with 150 people seeking refuge in public shelters. Damage in Chetumal was pegged at MX$1.4 billion (US$85.3 million). Seven municipalities were declared disaster areas accordingly. In nearby Veracruz, more than 600 mm (24 in) of rain caused widespread flooding; at least 50 municipalities reported damage from the event as multiple rivers over-topped their banks. Flooding in Tabasco affected 7,500 ha (19,000 acres) of crops. In Oaxaca, several roads were washed out by the accompanying floods and mudslides, particularly in the Sierra Norte region. Widespread flooding affected large areas of Chiapas and Guerrero, prompting dozens of evacuations. In Tapachula, Chiapas, 168 mm (6.6 in) of rain fell in just 90 minutes, triggering flash floods that caught residents by surprise. Hundreds of families were affected and 64 homes were damaged or destroyed.

== Impact as a tropical cyclone ==
=== Mexico ===
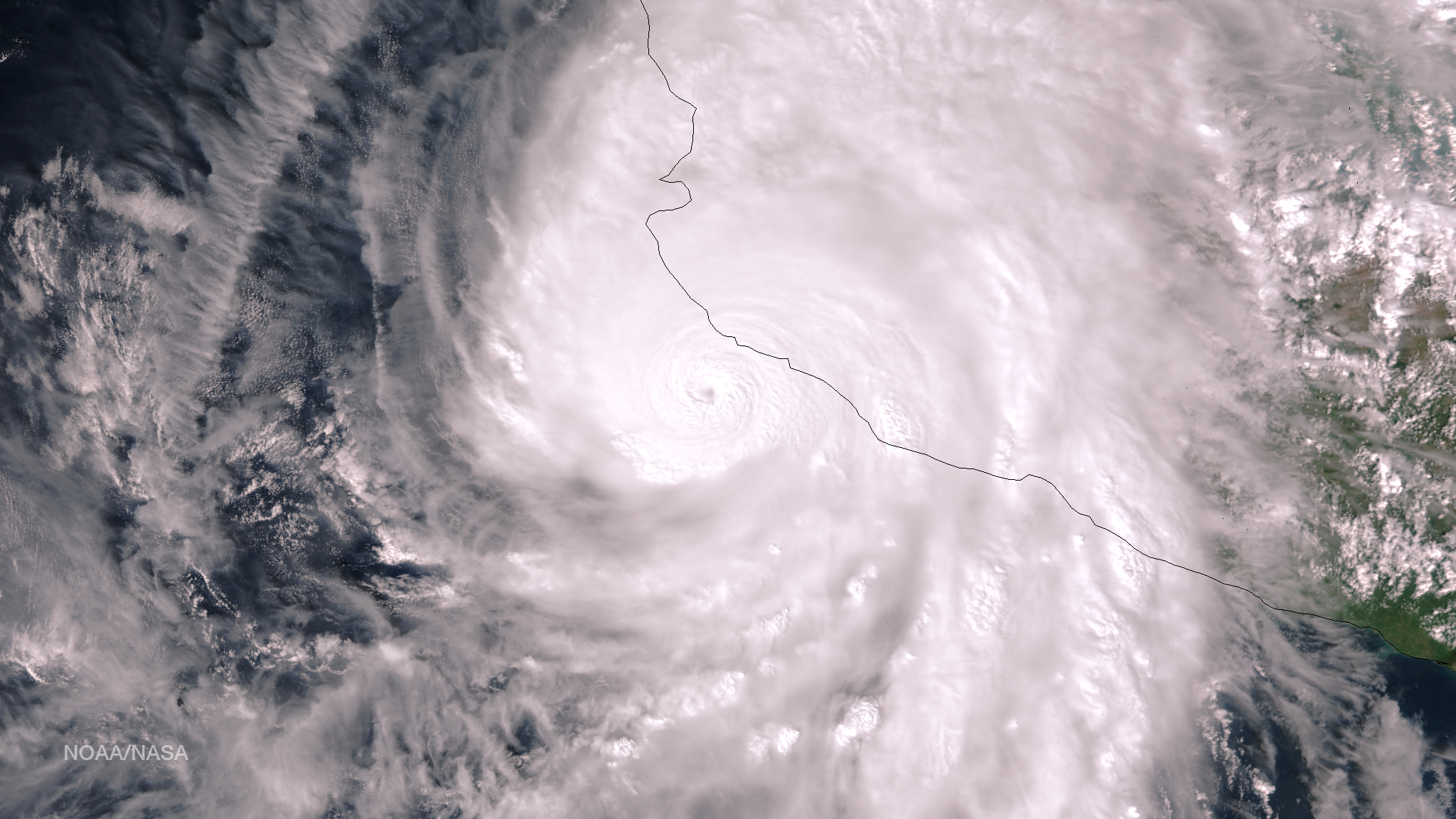
Hurricane Patricia hours before making landfall in Jalisco

Hurricane Patricia made landfall in Jalisco as a Category 4 hurricane during the evening of October 23. The 15 mi (24 km) wide core of Patricia largely avoided populated centers, passing through areas with a population density of less than 30 people per square mile. This, alongside effective evacuations, is credited for the relatively low death toll, despite the hurricane's intensity. Several small communities along the path sustained tremendous damage, however. Had the hurricane moved farther east or west, the densely populated areas surrounding Manzanillo or Puerto Vallarta would have suffered a direct hit.

Throughout the affected region, the storm's powerful winds left 261,989 people without electricity. Twenty-one of the nation's thirty-one states, and the Federal District, were affected by the hurricane's rain. Accumulations in Jalisco peaked at 383.2 mm (15.09 in) on Nevado de Colima. Roughly 42,000 ha (100,000 acres) of crops were affected across Colima, Jalisco, Michoacán, and Nayarit, with 15,000 ha (37,000 acres) deemed a total loss and 27,000 ha (67,000 acres) partially damaged. Six deaths occurred due to direct or indirect effects of the hurricane, all in Jalisco. Damage assessments indicate total losses around MX$5.4 billion (US$325 million), primarily from agriculture and infrastructure.

==== Jalisco ====
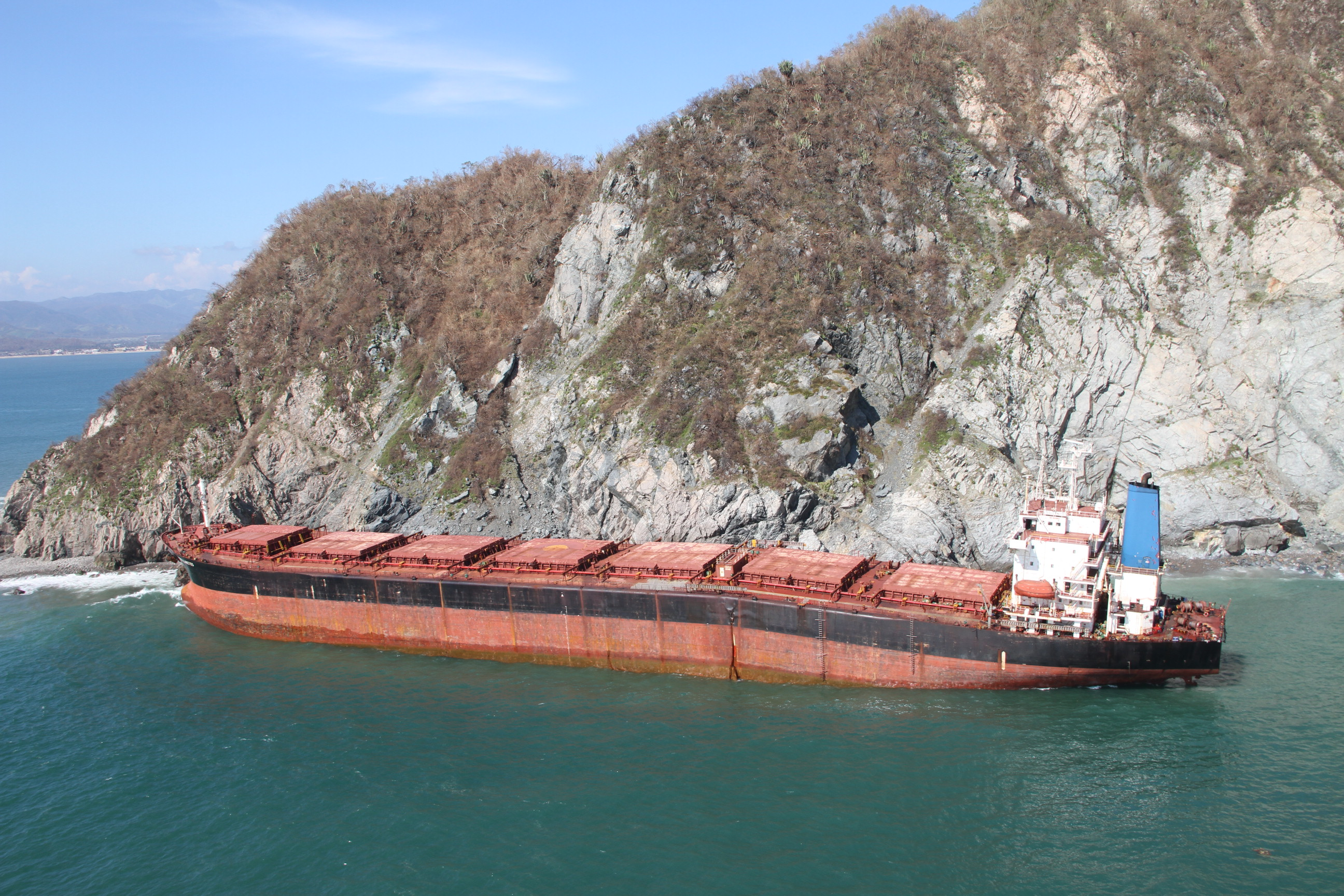
The bulk carrier Los Llanitos was grounded by the hurricane

Striking Jalisco as a strong Category 4 hurricane, Patricia wrought tremendous damage, though the most extreme effects were relatively localized. In the small community of Emiliano Zapata, the hurricane's violent winds tore roofs off homes and business. Countless trees were defoliated, stripped of their branches, snapped, or uprooted. Hillsides along the immediate landfall area were largely stripped of vegetation. Storm chaser Josh Morgerman described the aftermath: "... the tropical landscape was transformed into something barren and wintry." Furthermore, the winds toppled concrete power poles and crumpled transmission towers.

A total of six deaths in incidents related to Patricia were reported in the state. Two of these deaths occurred when a tree toppled over in the storm's powerful winds. A woman was also hospitalized after sustaining injuries in the same incident. Another four people were killed in an automobile accident in southern Jalisco. Two of the victims died in the wreckage and the other two died after being brought to a hospital.

Pacific hurricanes with a wind speed of 130 mph (215 km/h) or higher at landfall
Hurricane	Season	Wind speed	Ref.
Otis	2023	160 mph (260 km/h)	
Patricia	2015	150 mph (240 km/h)	
Madeline	1976	145 mph (230 km/h)	
Twelve	1957	140 mph (220 km/h)	
"Mexico"	1959	140 mph (220 km/h)	
Iniki	1992	140 mph (220 km/h)	
Kenna	2002	140 mph (220 km/h)	
Lidia	2023	140 mph (220 km/h)	

Throughout Jalisco, approximately 9,000 homes were damaged or destroyed. The coastal hamlet of Chamela, home to 40 families, was completely flattened. More than 24,000 ha (59,000 acres) of crops were affected across the state: 10,684 ha (26,400 acres) sustained total losses while 13,943 ha (34,450 acres) were partially so. Damage from agriculture amounted to roughly MX$168 million (US$10.1 million). Total damage reached to MX$1.139 billion (US$68.6 million). A cargo ship—the 735 ft (224 m) bulk carrier Los Llanitos—was shifted off-course by the hurricane and grounded near Barra de Navidad, Jalisco. Her 27 crew were unharmed but required rescue by a military helicopter. The ship was subsequently deemed a total loss and crews began scrapping the vessel on-site in February 2016.

==== Colima and Michoacán ====
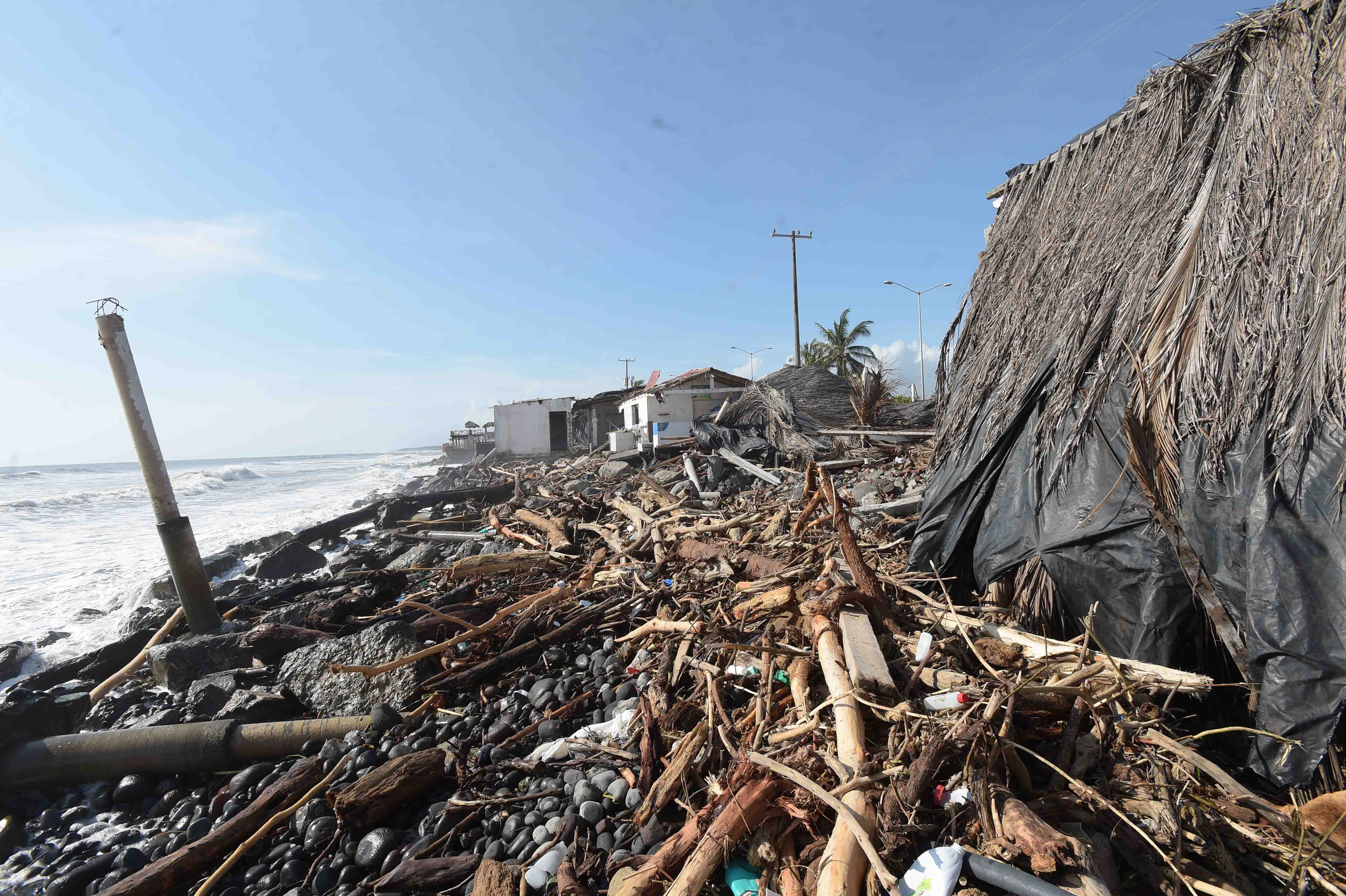
Coastal damage from Patricia in Colima

In nearby Colima, preliminary surveys indicated localized but severe damage. A total of 200 schools, 107 health facilities, 34 sport facilities, and 11,645 ha (28,780 acres) of agriculture were affected by the storm. Severe damage was incurred by the banana crops, with losses from the fruit alone estimated at MX$500 million (US$30.1 million). Total damage in the state reached MX$1.7 billion (US$102.5 million).

Although Patricia made landfall farther west, damage across Michoacán was severe. Numerous communities were temporarily isolated as roads were either rendered impassible or washed away altogether by floods. A total of 1,512 homes were damaged and another 127 were destroyed across the state, including 600 in Coahuayana. The storm severely damaged 150 homes in the Arteaga Municipality. A portion of Highway 200 was shut down in Aquila. Agriculture sustained extensive damage with 10,000 ha (25,000 acres) of crops destroyed; losses in the sector amounted to MX$2.5 billion (US$150.7 million). In Coahuayana alone, 5,600 ha (14,000 acres) of bananas were ruined, the greatest loss of crops in the municipality's history; thousands of residents lost their jobs as a result of the damage. Losses to health facilities in the state reached MX$13.5 million (US$814,000).

==== Other states ====
The hurricane produced large swells along the shores of Guerrero on October 22, causing damage to coastal structures. The remnants of Patricia brought heavy rain to much of northern Mexico on October 24. Up to 193 mm (7.6 in) of rain was observed in Tamaulipas, resulting in flooding. Dozens of structures sustained damage and hundreds were left without power, with areas in Reynosa and Río Bravo particularly affected.

=== United States ===
Patricia's direct effects in Texas were limited to southern areas of the state. Moisture associated with the hurricane streamed ahead of its circulation and interacted with a frontal boundary over the region. Antecedent rains saturated the region and produced severe flooding, with cars flooded and a train derailed. Fears arose that the collective effects of these storms would produce deadly floods, similar to those in May earlier in the year; however, no deaths resulted. Houston received 9.38 in (238 mm) of rain during a 24-hour span from October 24–25, and a brief tornado caused minor damage near the city. Rain fell at rates of 1 to 2 in (25 to 51 mm) per hour in southern Hidalgo County, leading to damaging flash floods. An estimated 10 to 12 in (250 to 300 mm), or more, accumulated across the Progreso–Weslaco area. Several feet of water rendered roads impassible, stranded cars, and affected more than 500 homes. Twenty-six water rescues were conducted in the area. Damage was estimated at $50 million. Several roads in and around Corpus Christi were inundated, including part of Interstate 37. Two hours of "blinding rains" flooded the majority of eastern Willacy County, prompting multiple water rescues, and leaving $2.5 million in damage. Remnant moisture then moved north and northwest through the Great Lakes, Appalachia and Mid-Atlantic states, and Florida Panhandle before exiting the nation. In Louisiana, the storm caused 1,200 customers to lose power. In both Mobile, Alabama and Pensacola, Florida, the storm caused record rainfall, and high waves forced Gulf State Park to close as well. Flooding and power outages occurred as far east as the New York metropolitan area.

== Aftermath ==
In the aftermath of the hurricane, 5,791 marines from Mexico's Naval Infantry Force were deployed to assist with recovery and rescue efforts. Rescuers reached some of the hardest-hit areas within a day of Patricia's landfall. Red Cross volunteers began needs assessments on October 24 and distribution of humanitarian aid started the following day. Power was restored to 88 percent of those affected within two days of the storm. Through the nation's livestock catastrophe fund, MX$150 million (US$9.04 million) were allocated for agricultural areas affected by the storm on October 29. Of this total, MX$76 million (US$4.58 million) were delegated to Jalisco.

The Secretariat of Social Development's budget allowed for MX$250 million (US$15.1 million) in relief funds for Jalisco. Of this, MX$34 million (US$2.05 million) were allocated for affected persons. On October 27, Rafael Pacchiano Alamán announced an initial fund of MX$5.3 million (US$319,000) through the Temporary Employment Program (Programa de Empleo Temporal) to help spur economic recovery in Colima. On October 28, 15 of Jalisco's 125 municipalities were declared disaster areas. Of the more than 24,000 ha (59,000 acres) of crops affected by Patricia in Jalisco, only 6,600 ha (16,000 acres) were covered by insurance. Through late January 2016, Instituto Nacional del Emprendedor provided entrepreneurs with MX$3.577 million (US$216,000) in funds.

In January 2016, the Michoacán Ministry of Social Development enacted a MX$10 million (US$603,000) rehabilitation program to build 605 homes in affected communities.

=== Retirement ===
Due to the hurricane's extreme intensity and the damages caused in Mexico, the name Patricia was retired by the World Meteorological Organization in April 2016. It was replaced with the name Pamela for the 2021 season.

== See also ==
- Weather of 2015
- Tropical cyclones in 2015
- List of the most intense tropical cyclones
- List of tropical cyclone records
- List of Category 5 Pacific hurricanes
- Typhoon Nancy (1961) – strongest one-minute maximum sustained winds on record prior to Patricia (tied), but data widely considered unreliable
- Typhoon Tip (1979) – most intense tropical cyclone ever recorded
- Hurricane Linda (1997) – strongest and most intense Pacific hurricane prior to Patricia
- Hurricane Kenna (2002) – Category 5 hurricane, made landfall at Category 4 intensity north of where Patricia made landfall
- Hurricane Willa (2018) – Category 5 hurricane, made landfall at Category 3 intensity north of where Patricia made landfall.
- Hurricane Lidia (2023) – Category 4 hurricane, made landfall at peak intensity north of where Patricia made landfall.
- Hurricane Polo (2026) – Category 5 hurricane, second-most-intense Pacific hurricane on record.
