= Marshallberg, North Carolina =

- Census-designated place
- Location within North Carolina
- Coordinates: 34°43′36″N 76°30′54″W
- Country: United States
- State: North Carolina
- County: Carteret

Area
  - Total: 0.65 sq mi (1.68 km^{2})
  - Land: 0.64 sq mi (1.65 km^{2})
  - Water: 0.012 sq mi (0.03 km^{2})
- Elevation: 3 ft (0.91 m)

Population (2020)
  - Total: 341
  - Density: 535.3/sq mi (206.69/km^{2})
- Time zone: UTC-5 (Eastern (EST))
  - Summer (DST): UTC-4 (EDT)
- ZIP code: 28553
- Area code: 252
- FIPS code: 37-41600
- GNIS feature ID: 2628643

Marshallberg is an unincorporated area and census-designated place (CDP) in Carteret County, North Carolina, United States. As of the 2020 census, Marshallberg had a population of 341. It lies on the mainland, directly across Core Sound from Harkers Island and Cape Lookout beyond that. Lying at the extreme southeast corner of a peninsula, it is isolated from other Carteret County communities and only a single road connects it to the rest of the state.

== Geography ==
Marshallberg is located east of the center of Carteret County, bounded on the east by Core Sound, on the south by The Straits, on the west by Sleepy Creek, and on the northeast by Great Marsh Creek. The community of Gloucester is to the west across Sleepy Creek. The town of Beaufort is 7 miles (11 km) to the west by water and 15 miles (24 km) by road.

The Marshallberg CDP has a total area of 0.66 square miles (1.7 km^{2}), of which 0.01 square miles (0.02 km^{2}), or 0.97%, is water.

== Demographics ==
Historical population
Census	Pop.	Note	%±
2020	341		—
U.S. Decennial Census
