= Emiliano Zapata, Jalisco =

Coordinates: 19.382778°N 104.965278°W

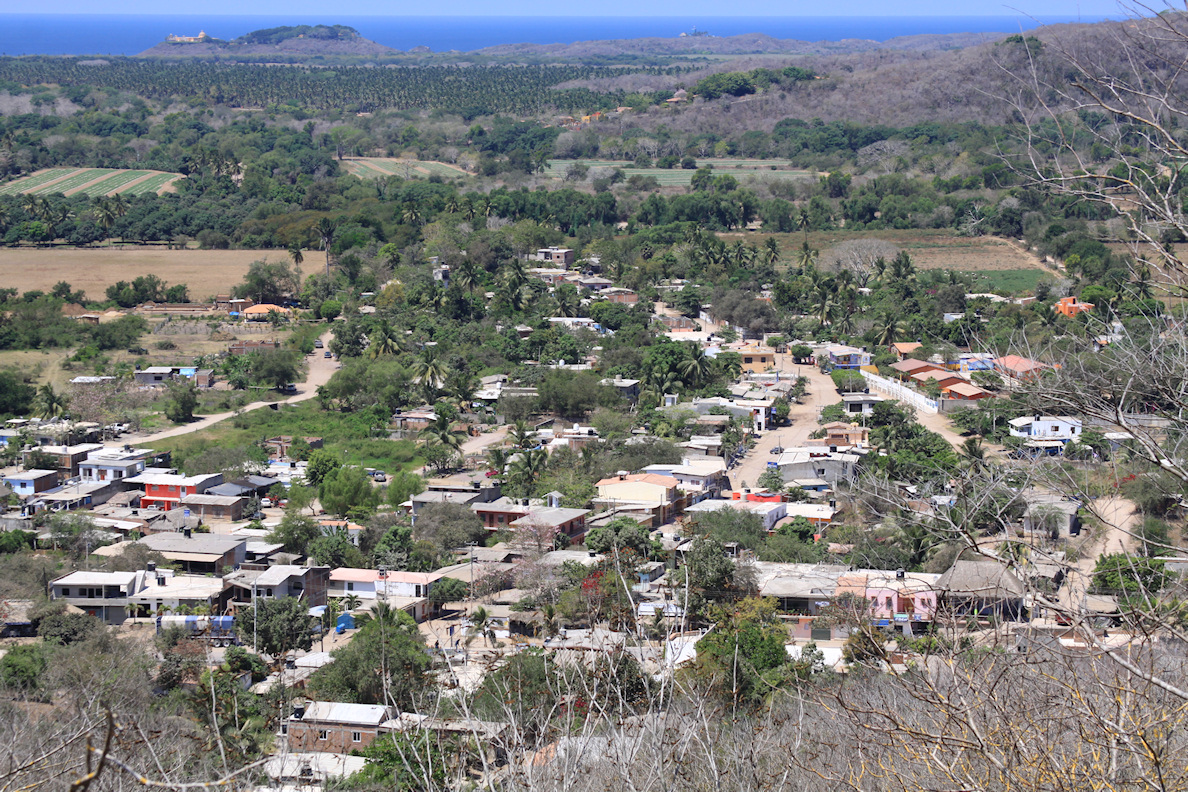
View of Emiliano Zapata and Francisco Villa, Municipality of La Huerta, Jalisco

Emiliano Zapata is located in the Mexican state of Jalisco in the municipality of La Huerta. at 40th Kilometer in the Highway 200 Barra de Navidad - Puerto Vallarta, in the south coast of Jalisco, it belongs to the touristic area called Costalegre. Emiliano Zapata is one of the largest villages in the municipality of La Huerta, geographically and culturally is neighboring Francisco Villa, where there's not physical boundaries between the towns.

Located at an altitude of 10 meters, Emiliano Zapata is home for 1,223 inhabitants. About 53 percent of the local population are adults. While the medium quantity of years at school is 6.17 years, there are still about 74 persons who do not know write or read. The longitude of Emiliano Zapata is 104.965278, the latitude is 19.382778.

Events in Emiliano Zapata include the "20 de Noviembre" fest, where traditional bull riding and artistic presentation take place, the second event is the religious fest on June 27 in honor to Our Lady of Perpetual Help with popular pilgrimage.
