= Hampton Springs, Florida =

Town in Florida, United States

Coordinates: 30.0854902°N 83.6548724°W

Hampton Springs is located four miles from the town of Perry in Taylor County, Florida, United States. It was once the site of the famous Hampton Springs Hotel which burned down in 1954.

== History ==
Once labeled "Dixie's Famous Spa", the Hampton Springs Hotel was very popular in the early 1900s, when Taylor County boomed due to the intersection of several railroads. The hotel was visited by Theodore Roosevelt, and even royalty from the far east. They came to swim in the sulphur swimming pool that fed from a spring adjacent to the creek (created by the junction of Spring Creek and Rocky Creek) which fed into the Fenholloway River downstream.

The ruins of the hotel, including the swimming pool, pathways, and a goldfish pond still remain. Taylor County renovated the site as a park. Picnic tables, a walking bridge over the river, parking, and fencing have been added. In 2018, the historic pool was filled in citing liability and vandalism as reasons

After the article was seen by local residents that still used these pools to swim and spent time keeping them maintained for use the county was ordered to reverse the fill and return them to the original condition so they may continue to be used for swimming and sightseeing.

== Gallery ==
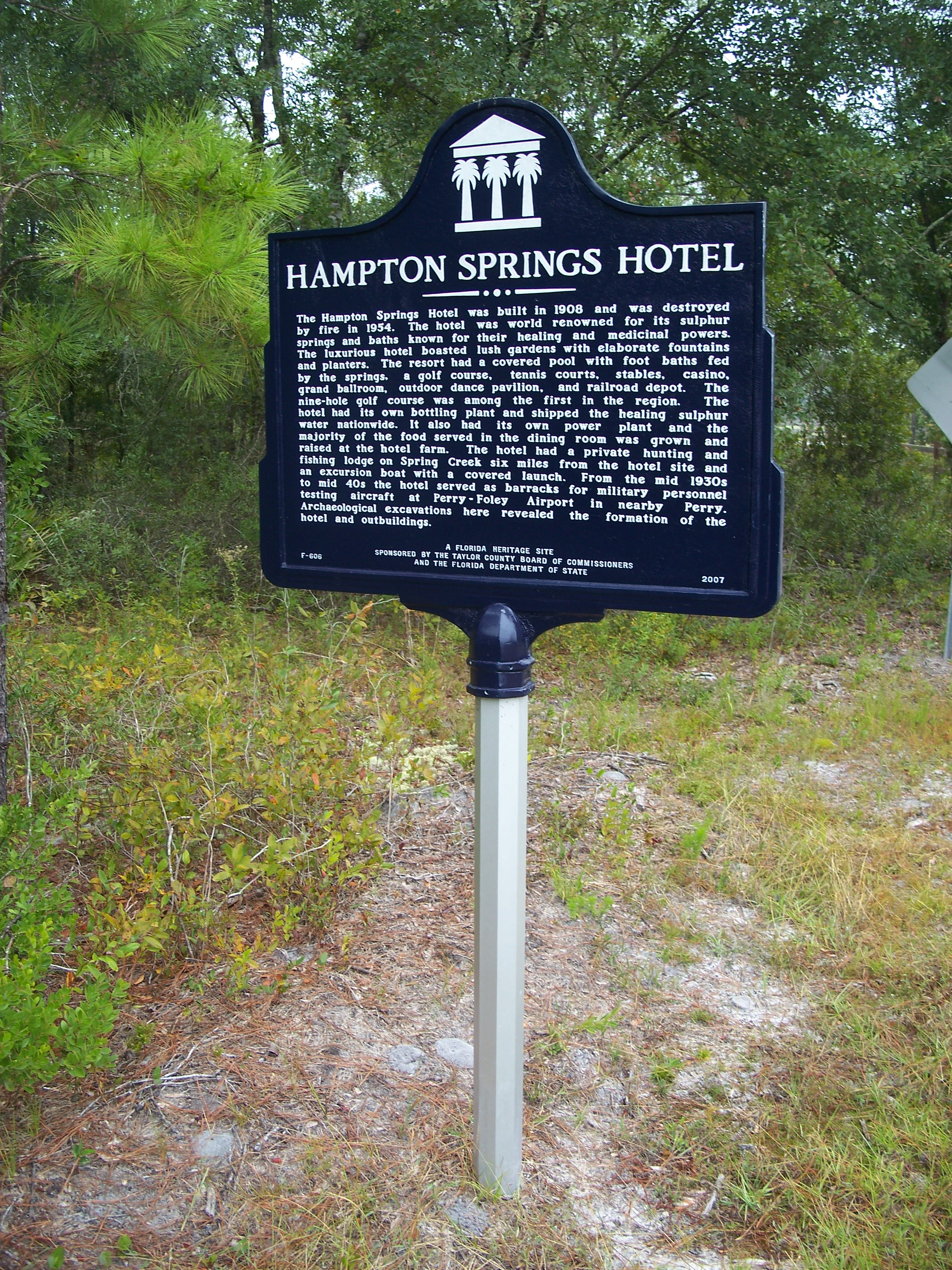

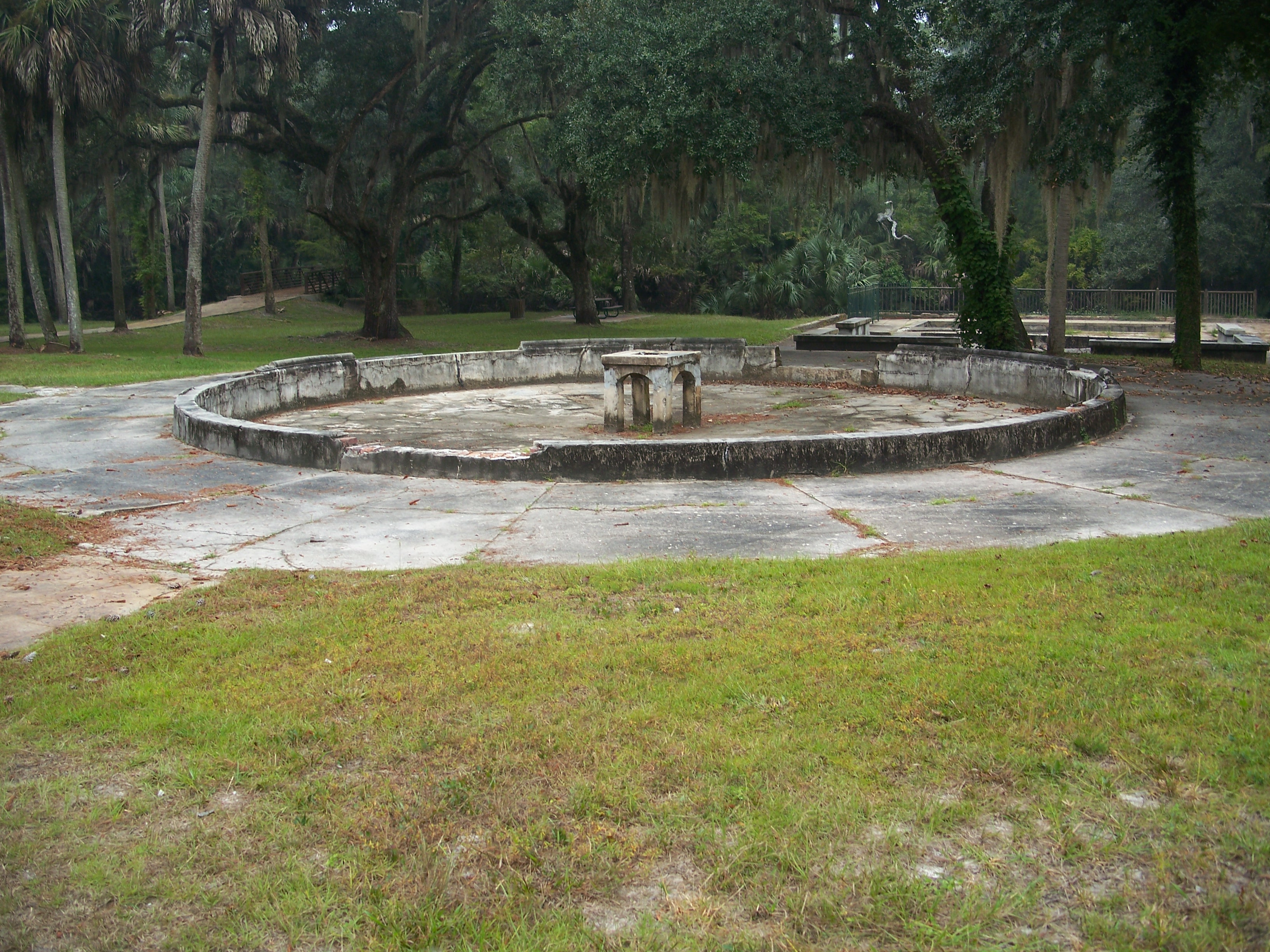

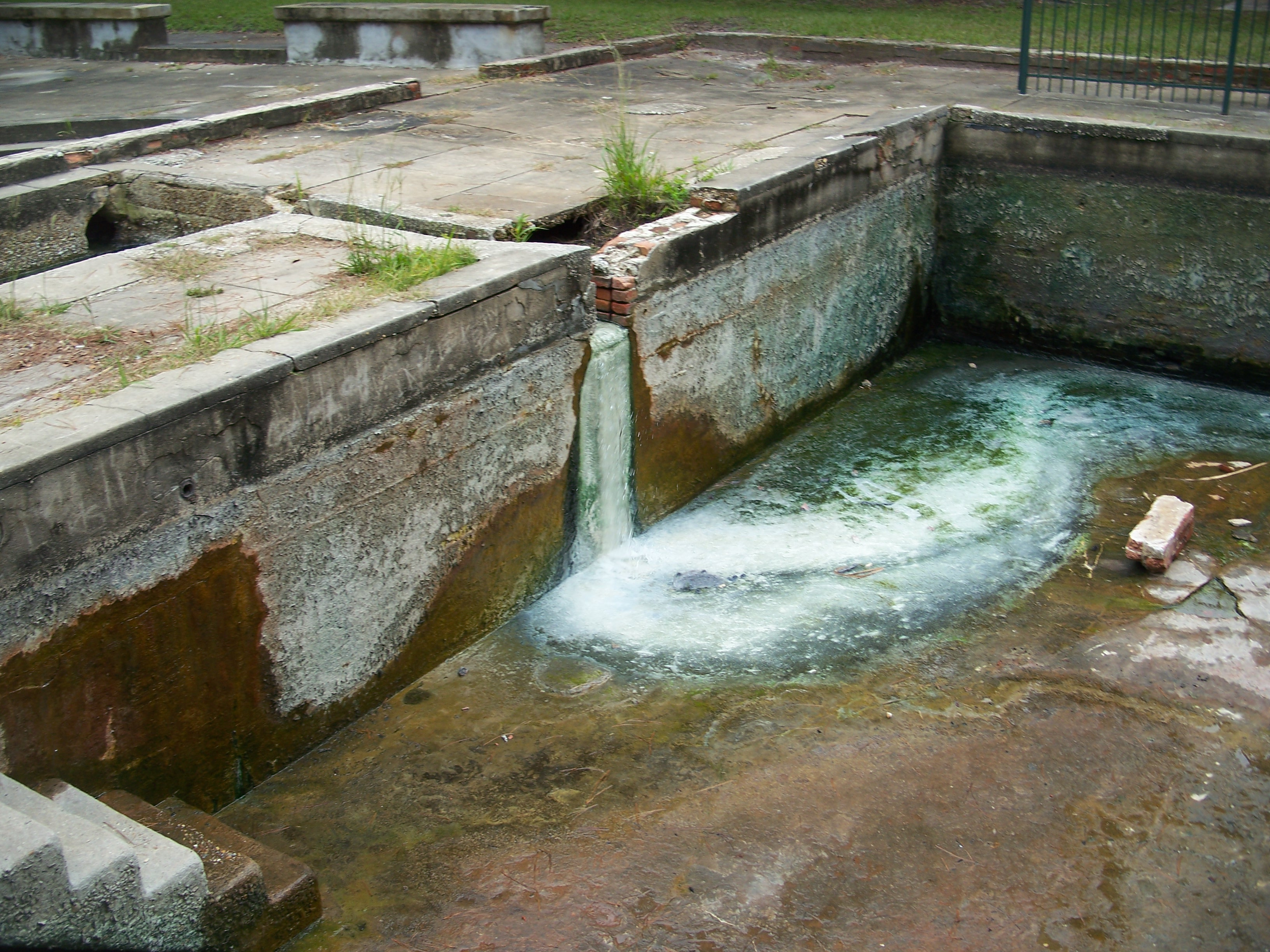

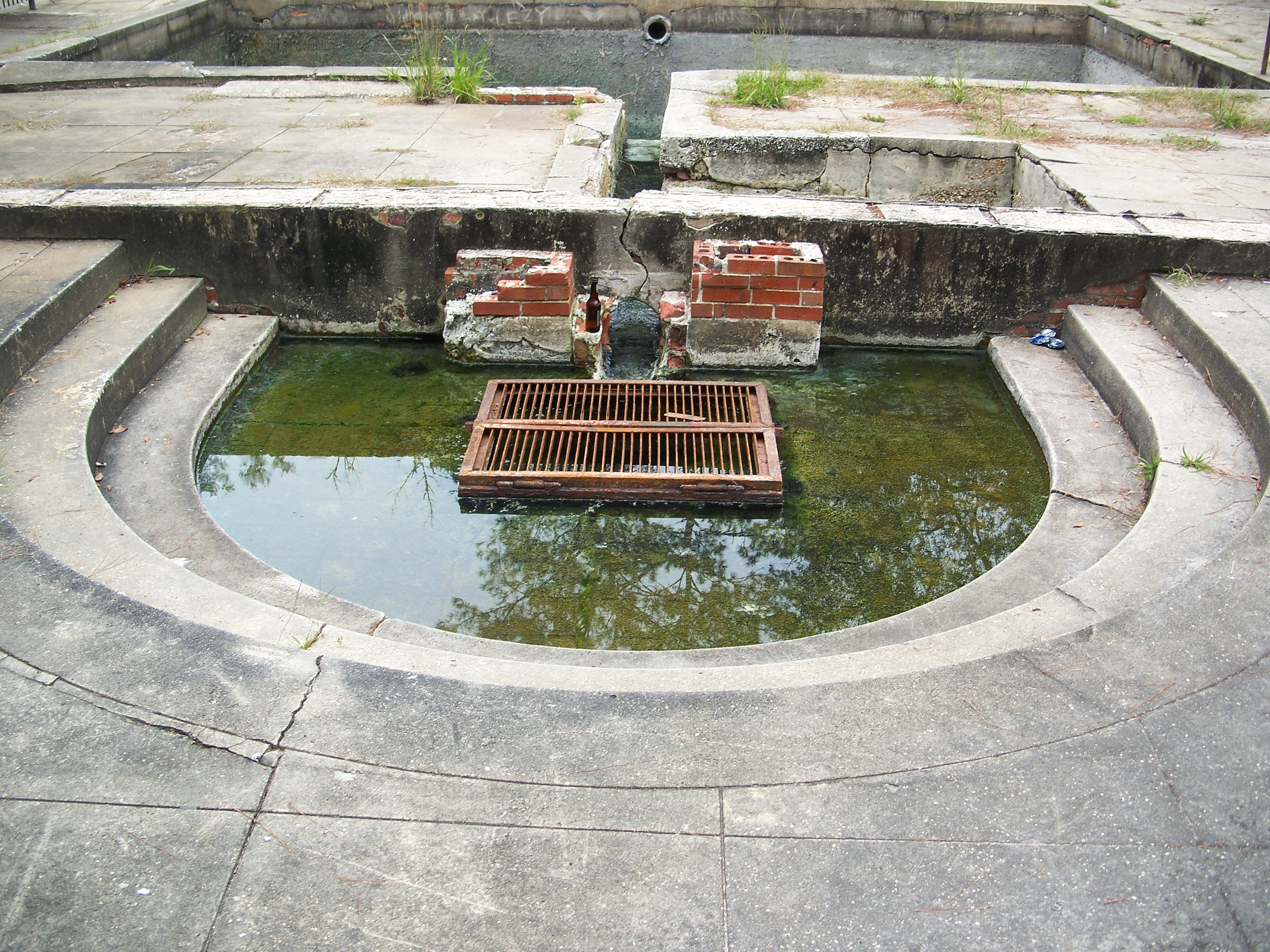

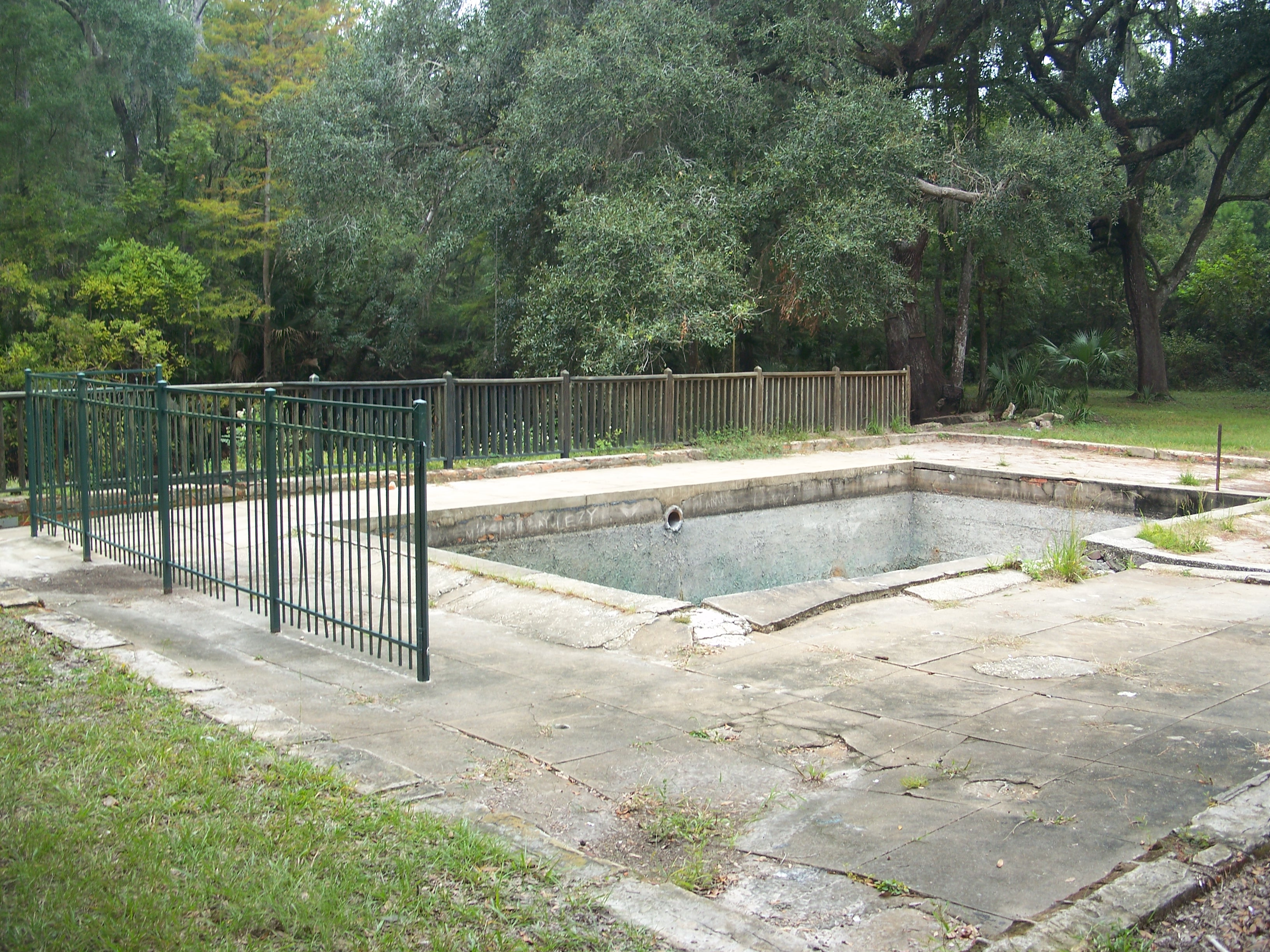

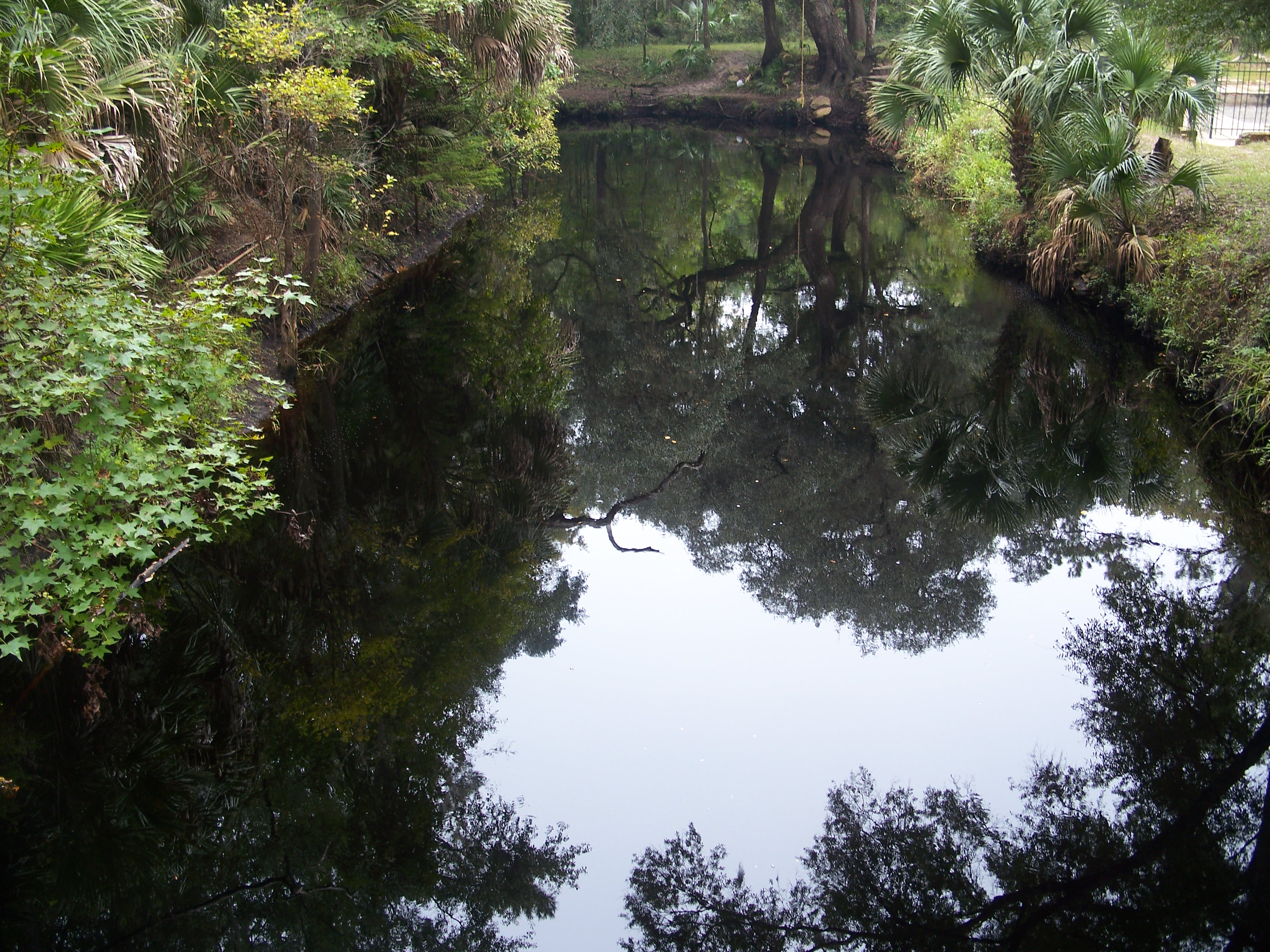

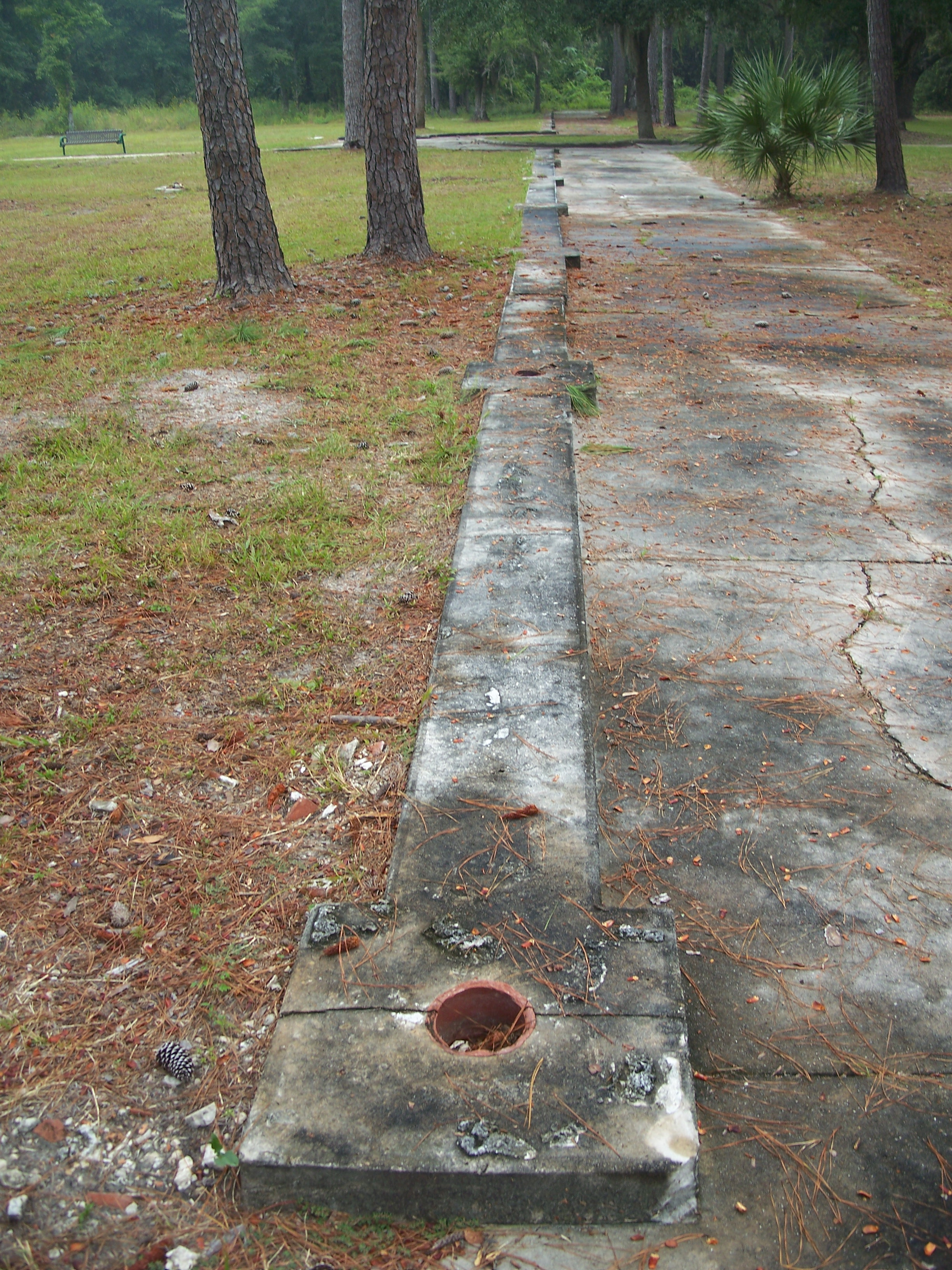
