= Mandeville, Jamaica =

Coordinates: 18°02′N 77°30′W

Mandeville Mandivl
- City
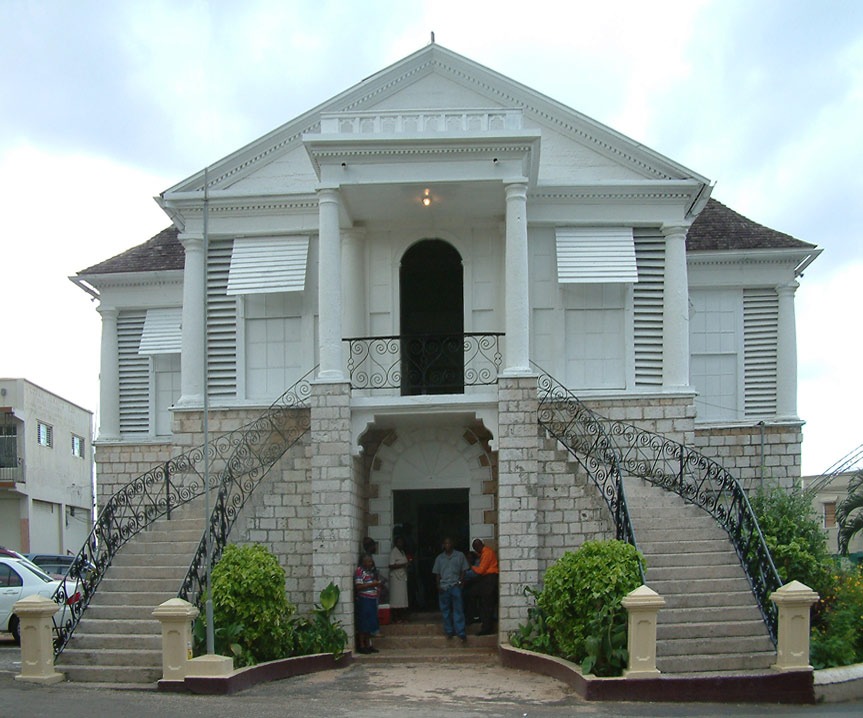
- Manchester Parish Court in Mandeville

- Location in Jamaica
- Country: Jamaica
- County: Middlesex
- Parish: Manchester
- Established: 1660-1683
- Elevation: 628 m (2,060 ft)

Population (2022)
  - Total: 21,686
- Time zone: UTC-5 (EST)
- Area code: 876

Mandeville (Jamaican Patois: Mandivl) is the capital and largest town in the parish of Manchester in the county of Middlesex, Jamaica. In 2022, the town had an estimated population of 49,695

. It is located on an inland plateau at an altitude of 628 m (2,060 ft), and is 103 km (64 mi) west of Kingston. It is the only parish capital of Jamaica not located on the coast or on a major river.

Mandeville has a town square, parish church and clock tower, and many large, elegant early nineteenth-century houses line the winding streets in the town centre.

In the suburbs of the town many large houses have been built by returning residents from North America and the United Kingdom on an ad hoc basis. Prominent suburbs and surrounding areas include Ingleside, Battersea, Knockpatrick, Clover, Waltham, Bloomfield, Caledonia Meadows, Brumalia, Newport, Spur Tree, Kingsland, French Park, Swabys Hope, Lincoln, Greenvale and Marshalls Pen.

Mandeville is a major commercial centre, and is the location of Northern Caribbean University (formerly West Indies College), a Seventh-day Adventist institution of higher learning.

The mayor of Mandeville in 2012 was Brenda Ramsay.

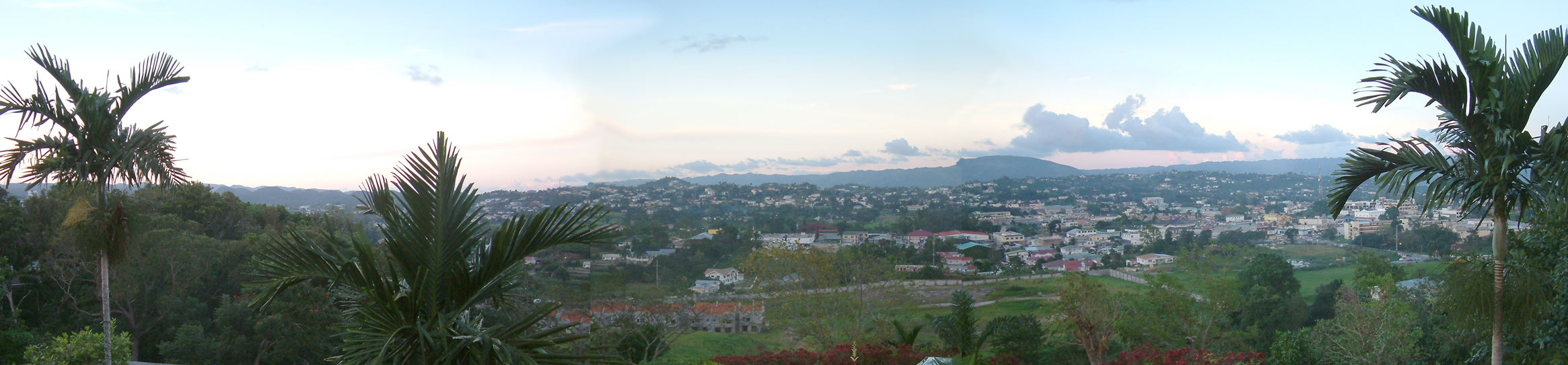
Panorama of Mandeville viewed looking North from Bloomfield Great House restaurant

== History ==
The town was laid out in 1816, and named after Viscount Mandeville, the eldest son of the Duke of Manchester, who was then governor of Jamaica.

Many of the original buildings can still be seen such as the courthouse, an impressive building of cut limestone with a horseshoe staircase and a raised portico supported by Doric columns and built in 1820. The staircase was added in about 1900.

Many of Jamaica's oldest businesses were started in Mandeville; the Mandeville Hotel, one of the oldest in the Caribbean, began operations in 1875. Its golf club, founded as the Manchester Golf Club in 1868, was the first golf course in the Caribbean. The first "free library" in Jamaica was established in 1938, and is the oldest Parish Library.

The growth of the town was given a substantial stimulus when the Alcan Bauxite Company in a joint venture with the Jamaican Government opened its Kirkvine works nearby at Williamsfield in 1957. It built houses at Mandeville for its then mostly expatriate staff. The relatively high wages lured many educated Jamaicans there. Subsequently, the town has seen an influx of Jamaican residents returning from abroad.

== Notable people ==
- Annastasia Baker, UK based Gospel, R&B, soul singer and songwriter
- Kimour Bruce, sprinter
- Kemoy Campbell, distance runner
- William "Bunny Rugs" Clarke, frontman for the Reggae/R&B band Third World
- Charmaine Crooks, Olympic athlete
- Paul R. Cunningham, Jamaican American surgeon
- Heavy D (born Dwight Arrington Myers), rapper
- R. James deRoux (1930-2012), Businessman and Custos
- Jovan Haye, current defensive ends coach for the Vanderbilt Commodores and former defensive lineman for the NFL
- Colin Heron, first-class cricketer
- Jacob Miller, reggae musician
- Alfred George Nash, civil engineer and legislator
- Lovel Palmer, Jamaican and international footballer
- Sheryl Lee Ralph, actress and singer
- Shenseea (born 1996), singer, musician, dancehall recording artist.
- Donald Richards (born 1955), Statistics Professor at Penn State
- Rumeal Robinson (born 1966), basketball player
- Garnett Silk (born 1966 - died 1994) reggae singer
- William Henry Pickering, astronomer
- Yaadcore, DJ

== See also ==
- Manchester Local Sustainable Development Plan
