= List of named storms (X) =

Storms are named for historical reasons to avoid confusion when communicating with the public, as more than one storm can exist at a time. Names are drawn in order from predetermined lists. For tropical cyclones, names are assigned when a system has one-, three-, or ten-minute winds of more than 65 km/h (40 mph). Standards, however, vary from basin to basin. For example, some tropical depressions are named in the Western Pacific, while within the Australian and Southern Pacific regions, the naming of tropical cyclones are delayed until they have gale-force winds occurring more than halfway around the storm center.

This list covers the letter X.

== Storms ==
Note: † indicates the name was retired after that usage in the respective basin.

- Xangsane

- 2000 – a Category 2 typhoon that struck Luzon and Taiwan, killing 181 people, mostly related to the crash of Singapore Airlines Flight 006; also known as Reming in the Philippine Area of Responsibility (PAR).
- 2006† – a Category 4 typhoon that affected the Philippines, Vietnam, and Thailand also known as Milenyo in the PAR.

- Xavier

- 1992 – short-lived tropical storm far off the coast of southwestern Mexico.
- 2006 – a Category 4 tropical cyclone that formed to the north of the Santa Cruz Islands in the South Pacific Ocean.
- 2018 – a tropical storm that brushed southwestern Mexico.
- 2026 – a Category 5 severe tropical cyclone that became the most intense cyclone in the month of November.

- Xina (1985) – a looping Category 3 hurricane far off the southwest coast of Mexico.

== See also ==
- European windstorm names
- Atlantic hurricane season
- List of Pacific hurricane seasons
- Tropical cyclone naming
- South Atlantic tropical cyclone
- Tropical cyclone
