= List of storms named Reming =

The name Reming was used for eleven tropical cyclones in the Philippines by the Philippine Atmospheric, Geophysical and Astronomical Services Administration (PAGASA), and its predecessor, the Philippine Weather Bureau, in the Western Pacific Ocean.

- Tropical Depression Reming (1964) – a weak system which was only tracked by the Philippine Weather Bureau.
- Typhoon Mamie (1968) (T6825, 30W, Reming) – a minimal typhoon that crossed the Philippines and Vietnam.
- Tropical Depression Reming (1972) – a short-lived tropical depression which did not cause any damage.
- Typhoon Fran (1976) (T7617, 17W, Reming) – a powerful typhoon that made landfall in western Japan and became one of its wettest and most destructive typhoons, killing 169.
- Typhoon Norris (1980) (T8012, 13W, Reming) – a relatively strong typhoon that struck Taiwan.
- Severe Tropical Storm Warren (1984) (T8423, 26W, Reming) – an erratic system which peaked as a Category 1-equivalent tropical cyclone; significantly affected the Philippines despite staying offshore, causing 73 deaths.
- Tropical Storm Reming (1988) – a tropical storm that was only recognized by PAGASA.
- Typhoon Elsie (1992) (T9228, 28W, Reming) – a very strong typhoon which affected no land areas.
- Tropical Depression Abel (1996) (30W, Reming) – a tropical depression considered by JTWC as a tropical storm; hit northern Philippines, claiming 8 lives and rendering 7 other people as missing.
- Typhoon Xangsane (2000) (T0020, 30W, Reming) – a destructive typhoon which killed 181 people in the Philippines and Taiwan, in addition to another 83 fatalities which came from a plane crash indirectly attributed to it.

The PAGASA changed its tropical cyclone naming list in 2001 to a more modern one, integrating names from their "Name-a-Bagyo" ("Name a Typhoon") contest three years prior. In those lists, the name Reming was originally excluded, but was reinstated in 2006 after replacing Rapido, which went unused during the 2002 season.

- Typhoon Durian (2006) (T0621, 24W, Reming) – an intense typhoon that killed almost 1,400 people in the Philippines and another 98 individuals in Vietnam.

The name Reming was retired from use in the Philippine Area of Responsibility after the 2006 season and was replaced with Ruby.
