= Tropical Storm Bebinca (2018) =

Pacific tropical storm in 2018

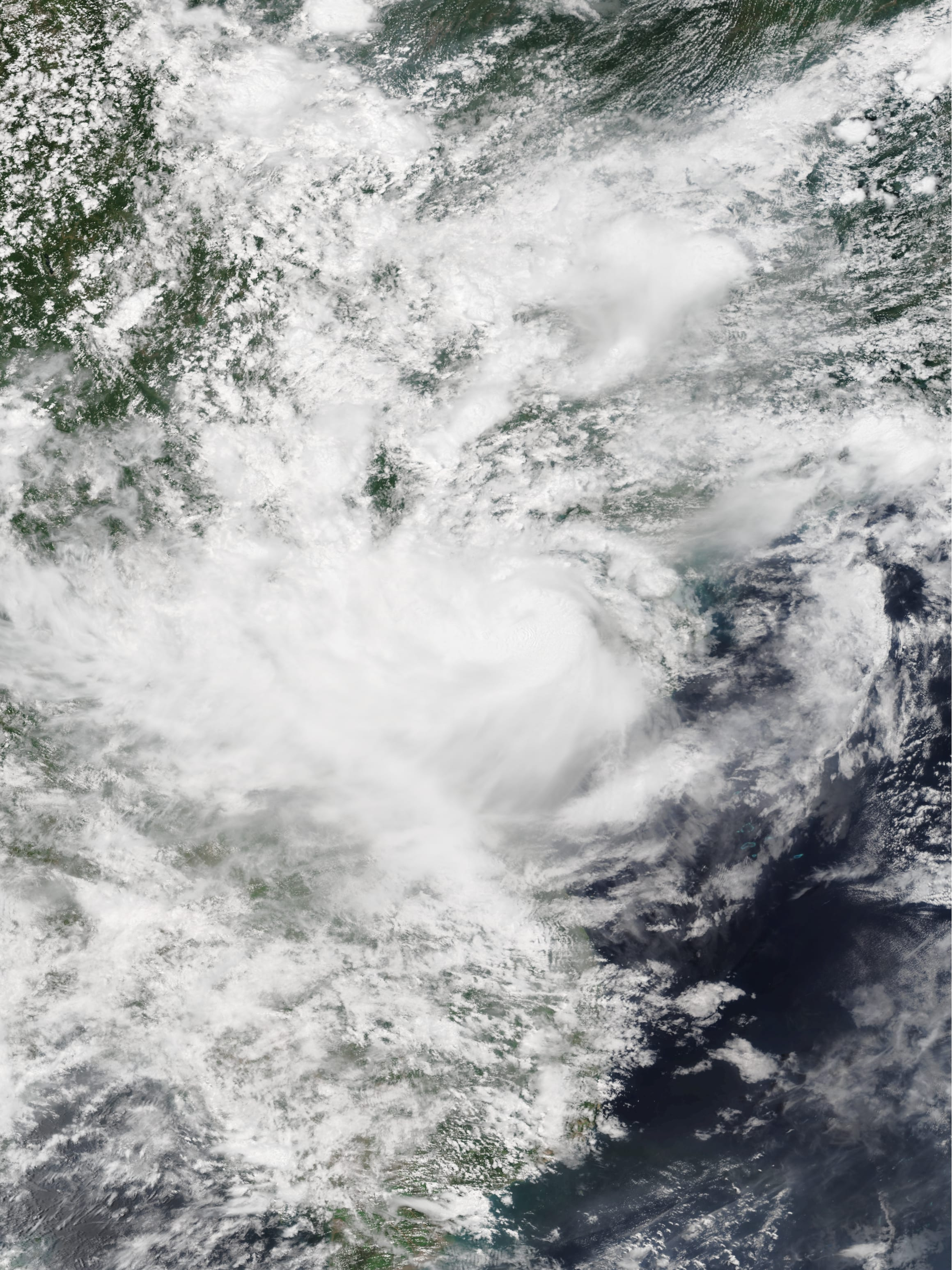
- Tropical Storm Bebinca near peak intensity approaching Vietnam on August 16

Meteorological history
- Formed: August 9, 2018
- Dissipated: August 17, 2018

Tropical storm
- 10-minute sustained (JMA)
- Highest winds: 85 km/h (50 mph)
- Lowest pressure: 985 hPa (mbar); 29.09 inHg

Tropical storm
- 1-minute sustained (SSHWS/JTWC)
- Highest winds: 110 km/h (70 mph)
- Lowest pressure: 979 hPa (mbar); 28.91 inHg

Overall effects
- Fatalities: 19 total
- Damage: $391 million (2018 USD)
- Areas affected: South China, Vietnam, Laos
- IBTrACS
- Part of the 2018 Pacific typhoon season

Tropical Storm Bebinca (Note: The name Bebinca was contributed by Macau and refers to a kind of milk pudding popular there.) was a weak but erratic and long-lived tropical cyclone that affected South China and Vietnam in mid-August 2018. Bebinca originated from a tropical depression over the South China Sea on August 9. Maintaining this intensity for a few days near the Guangdong coast, the system finally intensified into a tropical storm south of Jiangmen on August 13. The storm moved slowly to the east and then curved back on the next day, before making landfall in the Leizhou Peninsula on August 15. Bebinca crossed the Gulf of Tonkin and made landfall in Vietnam on August 16, before dissipated on the next day.

In China, 6 people were dead and the economic losses by the storm reached ¥2.31 billion (US$333 million). In Vietnam, Bebinca killed 13 people. Moderate damage to agriculture and infrastructure were reported in Northern Vietnam, with heavy rains caused multiple landslides and blocked the road. Total damage in Vietnam were over ₫1.34 trillion (US$57.6 million).

== Meteorological history ==
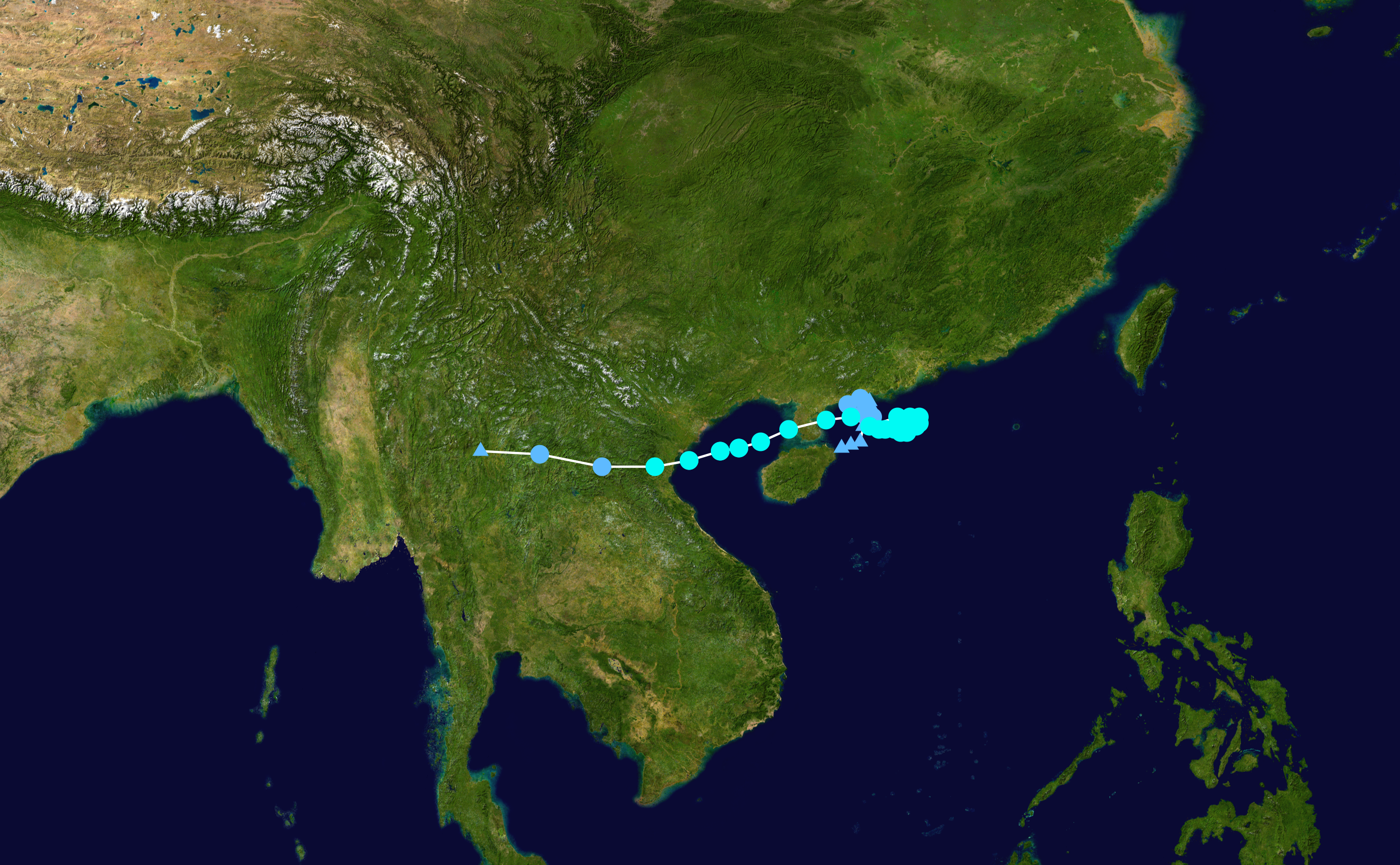
Map plotting the storm's track and intensity, according to the Saffir–Simpson scale Map key Saffir–Simpson scale Tropical depression (≤38 mph, ≤62 km/h) Tropical storm (39–73 mph, 63–118 km/h) Category 1 (74–95 mph, 119–153 km/h) Category 2 (96–110 mph, 154–177 km/h) Category 3 (111–129 mph, 178–208 km/h) Category 4 (130–156 mph, 209–251 km/h) Category 5 (≥157 mph, ≥252 km/h) Unknown Storm type Tropical cyclone Subtropical cyclone Extratropical cyclone, remnant low, tropical disturbance, or monsoon depression

Late on August 9, the Japan Meteorological Agency (JMA) began to monitor a tropical depression over the South China Sea. The system generally moved northward slowly under a subtropical ridge, and then turned to northeast on the next day. Despite moving over warm waters, the depression remained poorly organized. It moved ashore near Hailing Island, Yangjiang, Guangdong Province at 10:35 a.m. CST on August 11 (02:35 UTC). The depression made an anti-clockwise loop inland and moved back to the sea later that day. The system moved slowly southeastward, because Yagi and Leepi in the northwestern Pacific prohibited the extension of the subtropical ridge, therefore the steering current remained weak for days in the South China Sea. After moving back to the sea, the depression gained some organization, and the Joint Typhoon Warning Center (JTWC) finally classified it as a tropical depression and gave the numerical designation 20W on August 12. After maintaining tropical depression status for more than 3 days, 20W finally intensified to a tropical storm and the JMA gave the international name Bebinca early on August 13. Throughout that day, Bebinca's low-level circulation center (LLCC) was exposed because of moderate to strong easterly wind shear. Despite this, the JTWC upgraded the system to a tropical storm later that day.

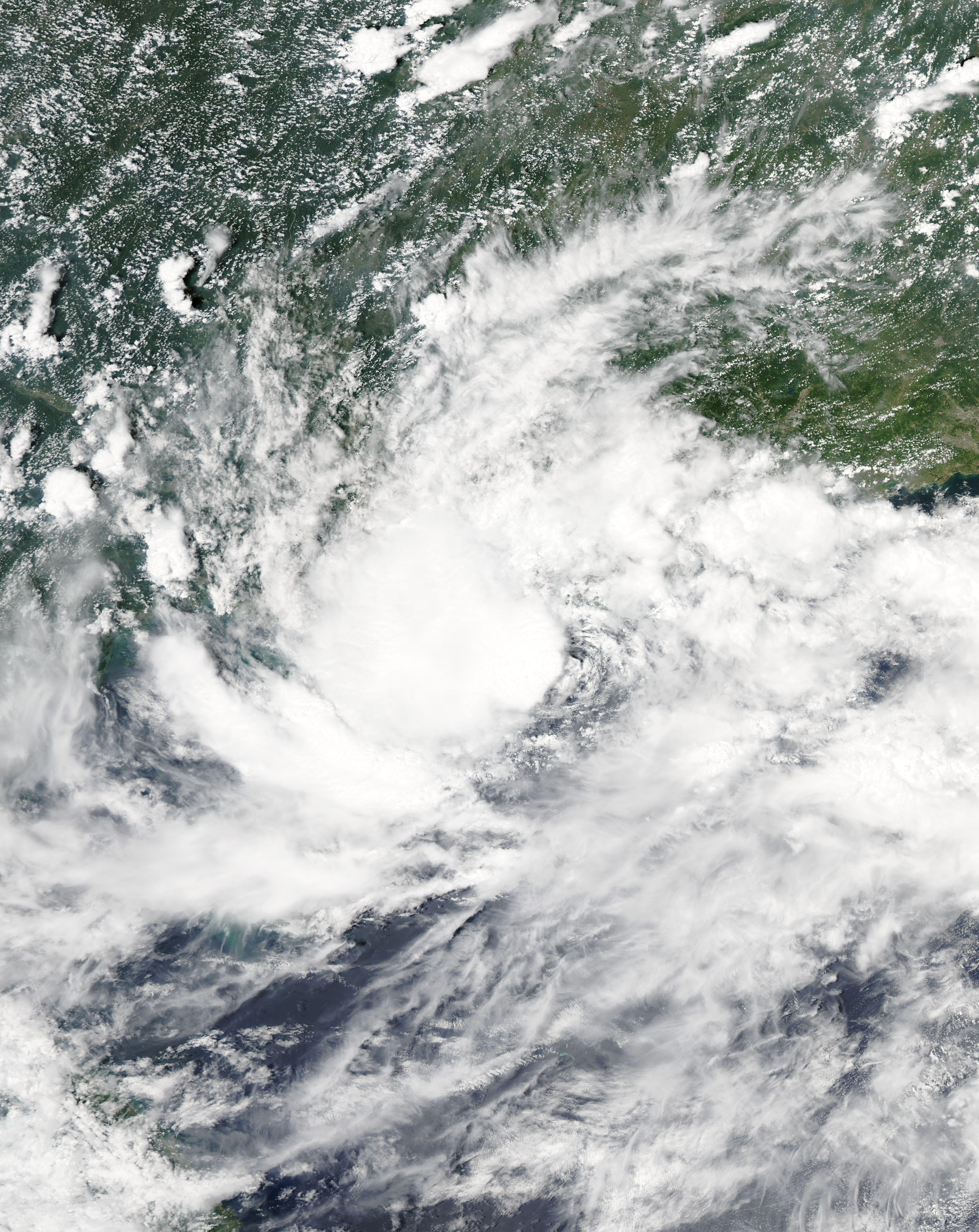
Tropical Depression 20W lingering south of Guangdong, China on August 12

Bebinca remained a sheared cyclone on August 14, while continued to slowly drifting to the east. After Leepi made landfall in Japan and dissipated, the subtropical ridge can finally extend and build over China, and Bebinca began to curve back to the west. Although wind shear remained strong on August 15, Bebinca still began to intensify as it was situated over very warm waters with 31 °C (88 °F), and the system was able to develop a central dense overcast. Bebinca made its second landfall in Leizhou, Guangdong at 9:40 p.m. CST (13:40 UTC), and emerged to the Gulf of Tonkin about four hours later. Once moving into the warm waters of the Gulf of Tonkin, Bebinca began another intensification trend. This prompted the JMA to upgrade Bebinca to a severe tropical storm, but it was revoked in the post-storm analysis. Bebinca weakened slightly before making its third and final landfall in Tĩnh Gia District, Thanh Hóa Province, Vietnam at 5:30 a.m. ICT on August 17 (22:30 UTC on August 16), with winds of 75 km/h (45 mph). Bebinca weakened quickly once moving inland, and the JTWC issued its final warning early on August 17. The JMA also downgraded Bebinca to a tropical depression, and Bebinca dissipated later that day, over Laos.

== Preparation and impacts ==
=== China ===
Shortly after the formation of Bebinca, the Hainan Meteorology Administration warned that the rainfall in parts of the Hainan Island peaked at 400 mm (16 in), with strong winds occurring in the Hainan Island and its nearby areas. As Bebinca meandering near the Guangdong coast, the agency urged that the northern part of the island were still affected by the strong winds and heavy rainfall on August 12–13.

Wind gusts of 77 km/h (48 mph) were recorded at Haikou. Due to the slow movement of Bebinca, Hainan Island was affected by extremely heavy rains. Rainfall in Haikou peaked at 936.8 mm (36.88 in) while rainfall in Lingao County were at 915.3 mm (36.04 in). Throughout the country, 6 people were dead and the economic loss were at ¥2.31 billion (US$333 million).

=== Hong Kong ===
The Hong Kong Observatory (HKO) issued the standby typhoon signal No. 1 at 5:15 p.m. HKT on August 9. Because of the slow movement of Bebinca, the standby typhoon signal No. 1 was hoisted for more than four days, the second-longest in recorded history. As Bebinca began to approach the Guangdong coast, the HKO raised the typhoon signal to No. 3 early on August 14. The HKO has warned that low-lying areas may be prone to flooding or backflow of seawater because of storm surge, and that members of the public should stay away from the shoreline due to rough seas.

=== Macau ===
The Meteorological and Geophysical Bureau (SMG) issued the signal No. 1 at 5:00 p.m. MST on August 9. As Bebinca began to approach the Zhujiang Delta, the SMG raised the signal to No. 3 early on August 11. Similar to Hong Kong, due to the slow movement of the storm, the signal No. 3 remained hoisted for more than three days, until it was replaced by signal No. 8 late on August 14. This broke the longest storm signal hoisted in recorded history.

=== Vietnam ===
Bebinca, known in Vietnam as Bão số 4 (Typhoon No. 4), made landfall over northern Vietnam early on August 17 in local time. The storm brought strong winds and heavy rains to the region, killing 10 people and 3 went missing. Besides, Bebinca damaged thousands of houses, causing moderate damage to agriculture. Heavy rains triggered numerous landslides and lead to some road accidents. Damages in Nghệ An Province were at ₫1.341 trillion (US$57.6 million).

== See also ==
- Other cyclones named Bebinca
- Weather of 2018
- Tropical cyclones in 2018
- Tropical Storm Amy (1994)
- Tropical Storm Nock-ten (2011)
- Tropical Storm Dianmu (2016)
- Tropical Storm Son-Tinh (2018)
