= List of storms named Leepi =

The name Leepi (Lao: ຫຼີ່ຜີ, [liː˧ pʰiː˩]) has been used for three tropical cyclones in the Western Pacific Ocean. The name was contributed by Laos and refers to scenic waterfalls in southern Laos. It replaced the name Xangsane, which was retired following the 2006 Pacific typhoon season.

- Tropical Storm Leepi (2013) (T1304, 04W, Emong) – affected the Philippines and Japan.
- Severe Tropical Storm Leepi (2018) (T1815, 19W) – made landfall in Hyūga, Miyazaki, Japan.
- Tropical Storm Leepi (2024) (T2412, 13W) – did not affect land.

Preceded by Tomo	Pacific typhoon season names Leepi	Succeeded by Bebinca
