= List of storms named Bebinca =

The name Bebinca has been used for five tropical cyclones in the western North Pacific Ocean. The name was contributed by Macau and refers to a kind of milk pudding popular there.

- Severe Tropical Storm Bebinca (2000) (T0021, 31W, Seniang) - a severe tropical storm that hit the central Philippines; killed 26.
- Severe Tropical Storm Bebinca (2006) (T0616, 19W, Neneng) - swept across the Honshū coastal waters as a tropical storm.
- Tropical Storm Bebinca (2013) (T1305, 05W, Fabian) - a weak tropical cyclone that brought minor impacts in China and Vietnam.
- Tropical Storm Bebinca (2018) (T1816, 20W) - a long and erratic storm that affected Southern China and Vietnam.
- Typhoon Bebinca (2024) (T2413, 14W, Ferdie) - became the strongest storm to hit Shanghai, China since 1949.

Preceded by Leepi	Pacific typhoon season names Bebinca	Succeeded by Pulasan
