= Typhoon Hagupit (2014) =

Pacific typhoon in 2014

Typhoon Hagupit (Ruby)
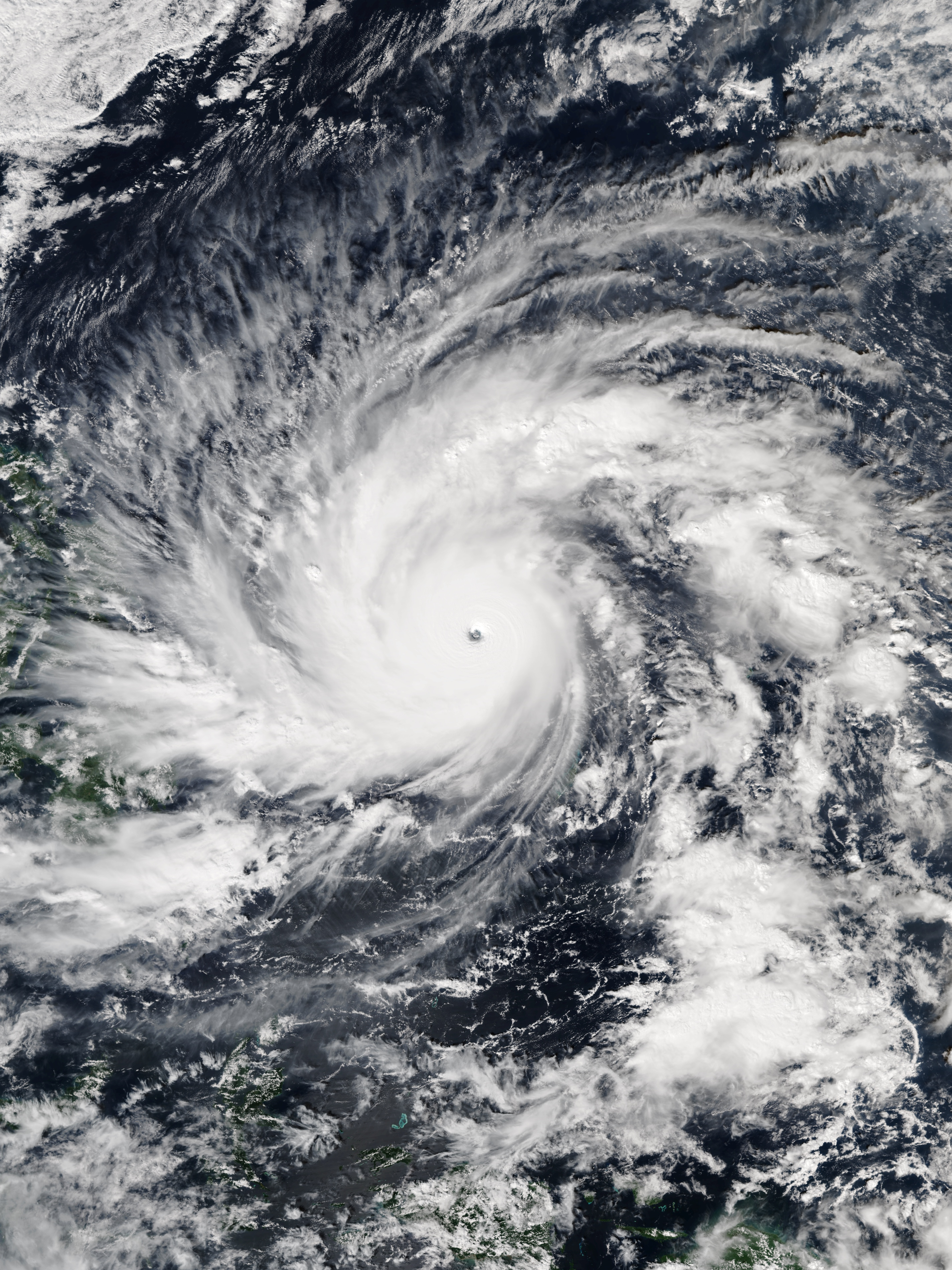
- Typhoon Hagupit shortly before peak intensity on December 4

Meteorological history
- Formed: November 30, 2014
- Dissipated: December 12, 2014

Violent typhoon
- 10-minute sustained (JMA)
- Highest winds: 215 km/h (130 mph)
- Lowest pressure: 905 hPa (mbar); 26.72 inHg

Category 5-equivalent super typhoon
- 1-minute sustained (SSHWS/JTWC)
- Highest winds: 285 km/h (180 mph)
- Lowest pressure: 907 hPa (mbar); 26.78 inHg

Overall effects
- Fatalities: 18 total
- Damage: $114 million (2014 USD)
- Areas affected: Caroline Islands, Palau, Philippines, Vietnam
- IBTrACS
- Part of the 2014 Pacific typhoon season

Typhoon Hagupit, (Note: The name Hagupit (Tagalog: hagupit, [hɐ.ɣʊ.ˈpɪt̚]) was contributed by the Philippines and means "lashing, whipping" in Tagalog.) known in the Philippines as Typhoon Ruby, was the second most intense tropical cyclone in 2014. Hagupit particularly impacted the Philippines in early December while gradually weakening, killing 18 people and causing $114 million (2014 USD) of damage in the country. Prior to making landfall, Hagupit was considered the worst threat to the Philippines in 2014, but it was significantly smaller than 2013's Typhoon Haiyan.

Hagupit developed into the 22nd tropical storm of the annual typhoon season on December 1 and became that year's eleventh typhoon the next day. Under a favorable environment, the typhoon underwent rapid deepening and reached peak intensity northwest of Palau on December 4, with a clear eye. Hagupit slightly weakened but restrengthened on December 5, but subsequently started to weaken again, due to subsidence associated with an upper-level trough.

The typhoon made its first landfall over the province of Eastern Samar in the Philippines on December 6, and then made three other landfalls over the country. Due to land interaction and its slow movement, Hagupit weakened into a tropical storm on December 8. When arriving at the South China Sea on December 9, deep convection of the storm diminished significantly. The system could not overcome the hostile environment and weakened into a tropical depression on December 11, before it eventually dissipated southeast of Ho Chi Minh City on December 12.

== Meteorological history ==
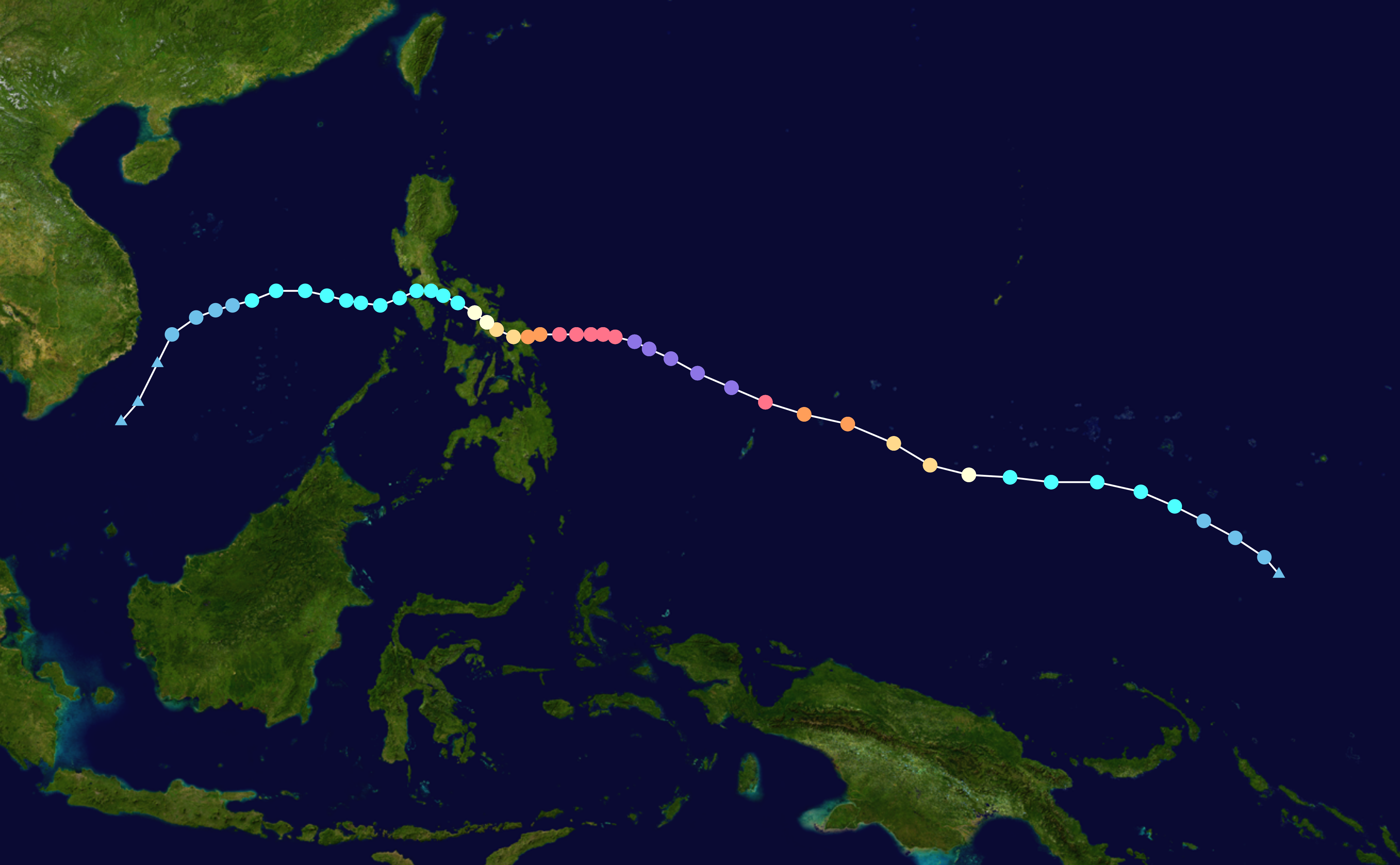
Map plotting the storm's track and intensity, according to the Saffir–Simpson scale Map key Saffir–Simpson scale Tropical depression (≤38 mph, ≤62 km/h) Tropical storm (39–73 mph, 63–118 km/h) Category 1 (74–95 mph, 119–153 km/h) Category 2 (96–110 mph, 154–177 km/h) Category 3 (111–129 mph, 178–208 km/h) Category 4 (130–156 mph, 209–251 km/h) Category 5 (≥157 mph, ≥252 km/h) Unknown Storm type Tropical cyclone Subtropical cyclone Extratropical cyclone, remnant low, tropical disturbance, or monsoon depression

A tropical disturbance formed about 130 km (81 mi) north of the equator and about 530 km (330 mi) south-southwest of Kosrae in the afternoon of November 29, resulting in the Joint Typhoon Warning Center (JTWC) issuing a Tropical Cyclone Formation Alert on the next day for consolidating under favorable upper-level conditions. Early on December 1, the Japan Meteorological Agency (JMA) upgraded it to a tropical depression, and so did the JTWC designating it as 22W. Only six hours later, the JMA upgraded the system to a tropical storm and named it Hagupit, as well as the JTWC, owing to a consolidating low-level circulation center (LLCC) with tightly curved banding wrapping into the system. However, the RSMC best track data indicated that the system had been already a tropical depression since November 30 and a tropical storm early on December 1. With low vertical wind shear and excellent radial outflow, Hagupit consolidated further on December 2 and was upgraded to a severe tropical storm by the JMA and a typhoon by the JTWC at noon. Late on the same day, the JMA upgraded it to a typhoon when it began to track west-northwestward along the southern periphery of the subtropical ridge.

A swath of GPM/GMI precipitation rates over Typhoon Hagupit

Remaining in a favorable environment, Hagupit underwent rapid deepening in the afternoon on December 3 and as a result, the JTWC upgraded it to a super typhoon due to the system depicting a significant eye.

The PAGASA named the typhoon Ruby as it entered the Philippine Area of Responsibility early on December 4. Simultaneously, Hagupit presented the very tightly curved and deep convective banding with a clear 35 km (22 mi) eye, which 1-minute maximum sustained winds reached 285 km/h (177 mph), equivalent to Category 5 of the Saffir–Simpson hurricane wind scale (SSHWS). The JTWC also forecast that Hagupit would become as strong as Typhoon Haiyan, but it failed to intensify further. The JMA analyzed that Hagupit had reached peak intensity at 06:00 UTC, with the 10-minute maximum sustained winds at 215 km/h (134 mph) and the central pressure at 905 hPa (26.72 inHg). However, the system then started an eyewall replacement cycle and due to moderate easterly vertical wind shear, became less symmetric, with the bulk of the deep convection displaced over the western semi-circle.

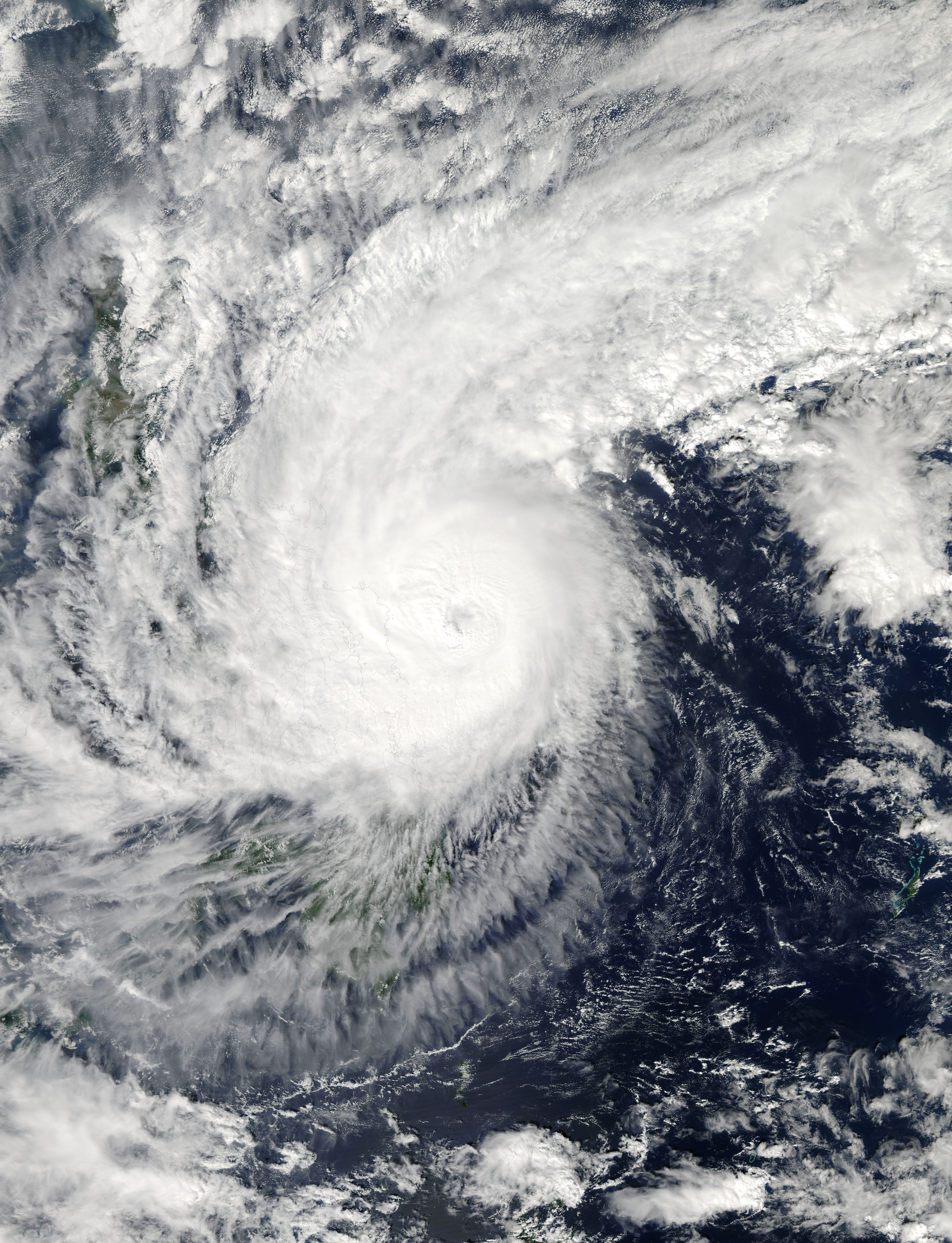
Typhoon Hagupit approaching the Philippines on December 6

As Hagupit slowed down and continued a weakening trend, the eye became cloud-filled early on December 5, and as a result, was no longer equivalent to Category 5 of the SSHWS. Because of a robust poleward outflow channel into the mid-latitude westerlies to the north, the eye became clearer and was surrounded by a symmetric annulus of intense convection; the JMA also indicated the brief intensification at noon. Moreover, a slight break in the steering and the zonal flow along the southern periphery of the mid-latitude trough lacked the dynamics to influence Hagupit, making the typhoon move westward very slowly. Outflow in the southeast quadrant got hampered due to subsidence associated with an upper-level trough, resulting in a cloud-filled eye again. Thus, Hagupit weakened further, causing the JTWC to downgrade it to a typhoon early on December 6. At 21:15 PST (13:15 UTC), Typhoon Hagupit made landfall over Dolores, Eastern Samar, with the 10-minute maximum sustained winds of 165 km/h (103 mph). Half a day later, the system made its second landfall over Cataingan, Masbate and turned west-northwestward.

Owing to land interaction and its slow movement, the JMA downgraded Hagupit to a severe tropical storm on December 7 at 21:00 UTC. The JTWC also downgraded Hagupit to a tropical storm early on December 8 right before the fragmented system made its third landfall over Torrijos, Marinduque. After its fourth landfall over San Juan, Batangas at 17:45 PST (09:45 UTC), the JMA downgraded Hagupit to a tropical storm at noon. On December 9, deep convection over the LLCC weakened significantly when Hagupit arrived at the South China Sea and turned westward, although good poleward outflow channel tapping into the mid-latitude westerlies helped the system sustain its minimal tropical storm intensity. Soon after that, due to a marginally favorable environment, deep convection over the partially exposed LLCC increased again. Hagupit briefly intensified in the afternoon on December 9, under moderate vertical wind shear offset by vigorous poleward outflow into the strong westerly flow to the north. However, deep convection began to be displaced from the partially exposed LLCC one day after.

On December 11, despite favorable poleward outflow, Hagupit was not able to overcome upper-level subsidence in the southeastern quadrant and increasing vertical wind shear, as low-level northeasterly winds became completely out of phase with the upper-level. Consequently, the JMA downgraded it to a tropical depression, and so did the JTWC. The JTWC issued its final warning on Hagupit due to the LLCC of Hagupit being displaced from the deep convection and rapidly unraveling early on December 12. Hagupit eventually dissipated southeast of Ho Chi Minh City, Vietnam, before noon on December 12.

== Preparations ==
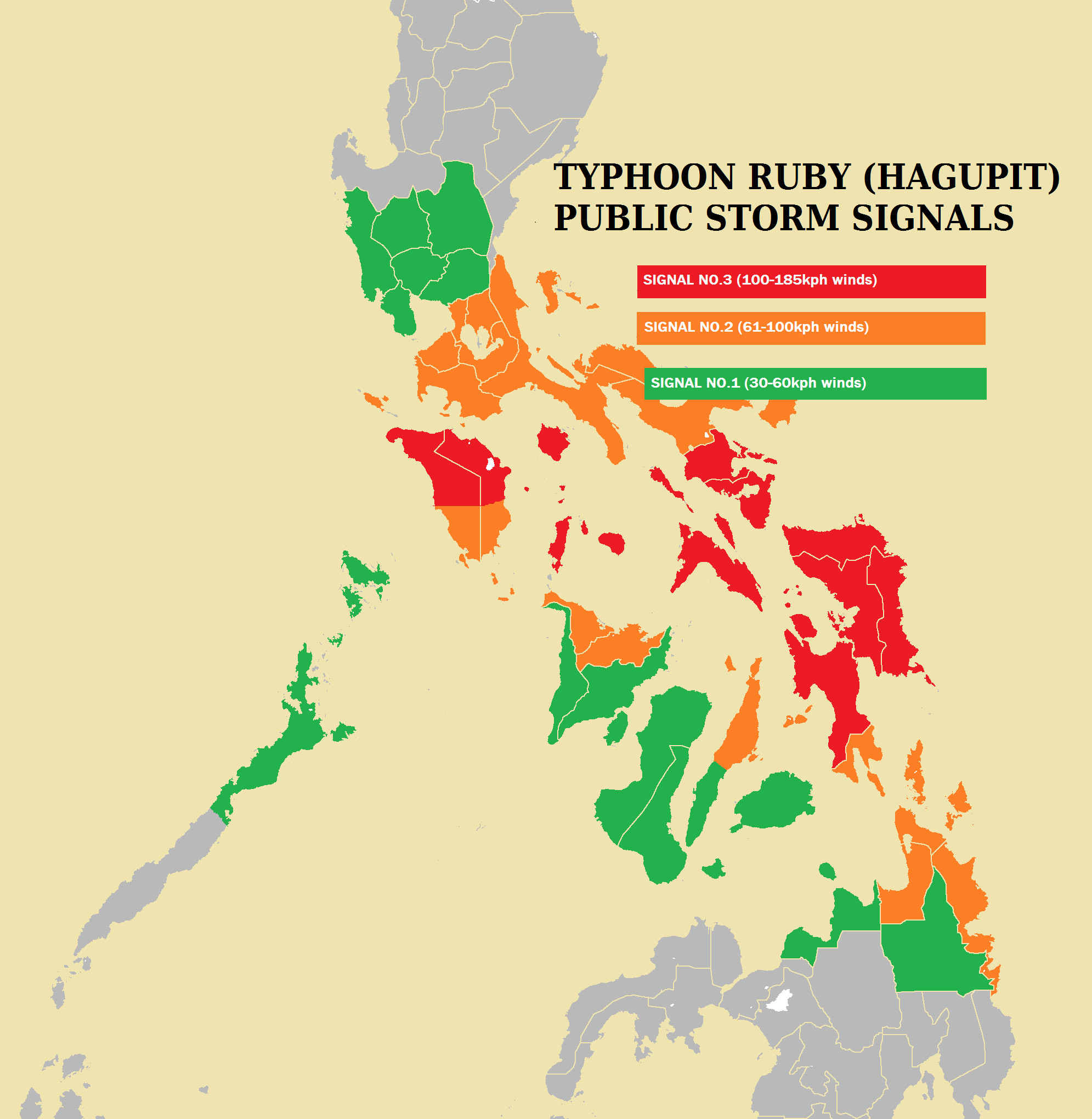
PSWS Map in the Philippines during the passage of Typhoon Hagupit (Ruby)

Typhoon Hagupit, also known as Typhoon Ruby, entered the PAR late on December 3, at the same time it was upgraded into a Category 5 super typhoon. With this, the NDRRMC reported that schools were suspended in the areas: Samar, Biliran and Tacloban during December 4–5. On December 5, the NDRRMC had put up Signal Warnings No. 1 and 2 from the lower part of Luzon to the upper part of Mindanao. Rough seas and gale-force winds were warned over the seaboards over the eastern part of the country. The Department of Health went under Code Red alert at DOH-retained hospitals in regions expected to be hit by the typhoon starting on December 6. At the same time, PAGASA has put up Signal No. 3 warnings over Samar and were expecting storm surge up to 4 metres high. Residents in at least 42 areas in Bicol and Visayas took precautionary measures against possible storm surge due to Ruby. As of 7:30 a.m, Project NOAH said three of the 42 are under Storm Surge Advisory (SSA) 3, 11 are under SSA 2, and the rest are under SSA 1. SSA 3 involves waves of up to four meters above sea level; SSA 2 three meters; and SSA 1 two meters. It was also reported that schools and businesses were closed from December 5–6 in places in Visayas and southern Luzon.

Because of its slow movement, preparations were further warned in areas such as southern Luzon and western Visayas. The PAGASA and NDRRMC warned that classes and businesses were suspended again during December 8–9 in Regions III, IV-A, IV-B and NCR. Early on December 8, the PAGASA had issued a Signal No. 2 warning over Metro Manila and the MMDA has also been put on red alert because of the typhoon. On December 8, the NDRRMC had reported that other regions such as Regions I, V, VII and XIII has no classes during December 8–9.

== Impact ==
As a weakening Category 3 typhoon, Hagupit first made landfall over Dolores, Eastern Samar on December 6. Because of its slow movement, Signal Warning No. 3 were still up in some places in Visayas. The next day, Hagupit made its second landfall over Cataingan, Masbate.

As of December 19, at least 18 people had been confirmed dead by the typhoon, leaving nearly 916 injured according to the NDRRMC. Total financial loss were calculated at PhP5.09 billion (US$114 million).

== Retirement ==
The name Ruby was the replacement for the name Reming, which was retired by PAGASA after its 2006 incarnation. Despite being used for the first time, PAGASA announced that the name Ruby would be retired from its naming lists after incurring over PhP1 billion in damages. The name its replacement was replaced with Rosita to replace Ruby and used for the first time and only time during the 2018 season.

== See also ==
- Weather of 2014
- Tropical cyclones in 2014
- Other tropical cyclones named Hagupit
- Other tropical cyclones named Ruby
