= Typhoon Xangsane (2000) =

Pacific typhoon in 2000

Typhoon Xangsane (Reming)
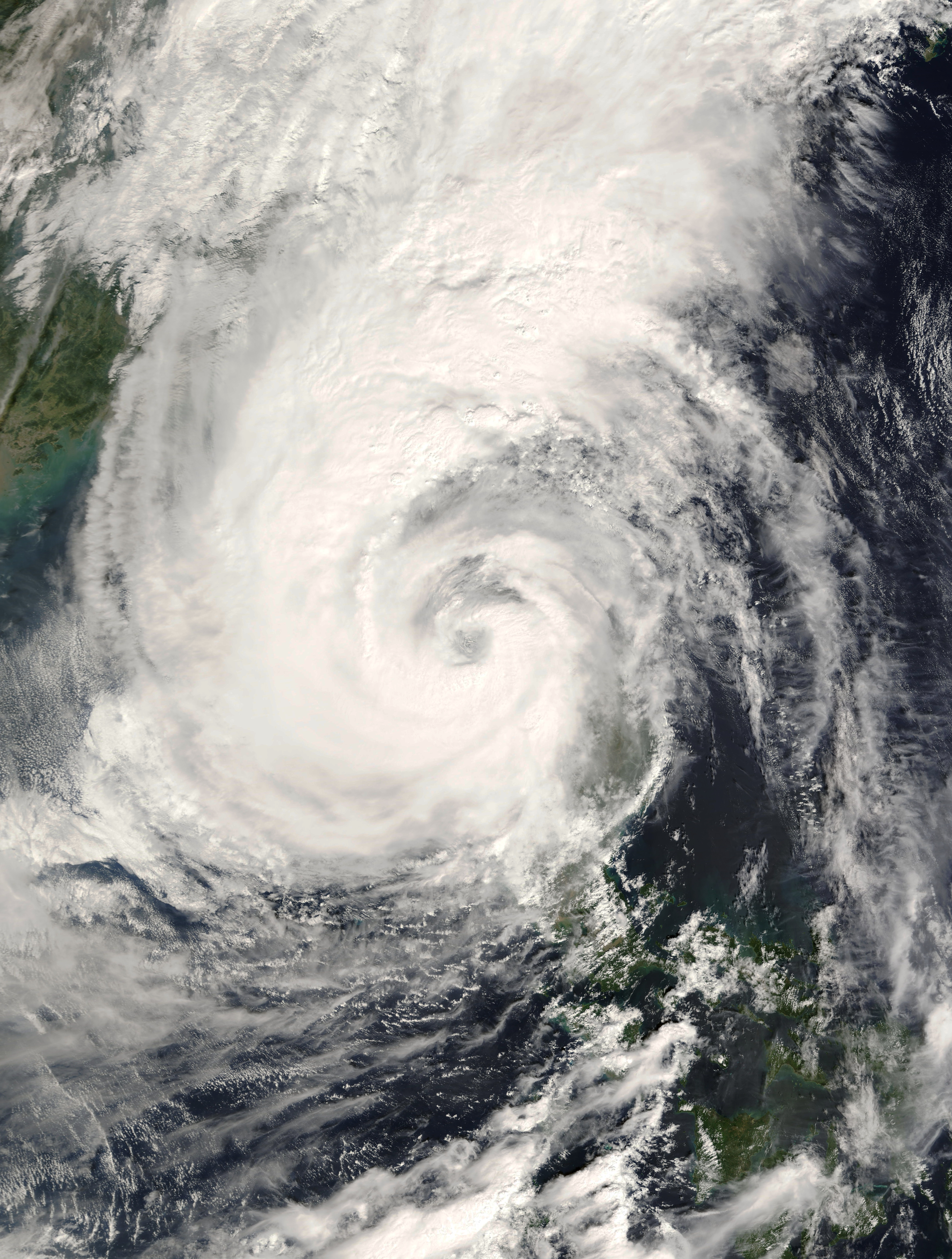
- Xangsane at peak intensity on October 31

Meteorological history
- Formed: October 24, 2000
- Extratropical: November 1, 2000
- Dissipated: November 2, 2000

Typhoon
- 10-minute sustained (JMA)
- Highest winds: 140 km/h (85 mph)
- Lowest pressure: 960 hPa (mbar); 28.35 inHg

Category 2-equivalent typhoon
- 1-minute sustained (SSHWS/JTWC)
- Highest winds: 165 km/h (105 mph)

Overall effects
- Fatalities: 187 total (including 83 aboard Singapore Airlines Flight 006)
- Damage: $527 million (2000 USD)
- Areas affected: Caroline Islands, Philippines, Taiwan, Japan
- IBTrACS
- Part of the 2000 Pacific typhoon season

Typhoon Xangsane, (Note: The name Xangsane (Lao: ຊ້າງສານ, [saːŋ˥˨ saːn˨˦]) was contributed by Laos and means elephant in Lao.) known in the Philippines as Typhoon Reming, was a typhoon that made landfall in the Philippines and Taiwan in late October 2000. The 30th named storm and 12th typhoon of the 2000 Pacific typhoon season. Xangsane made landfall in southern Luzon in the Philippines, on October 27. The storm then turned north, heading northeastward over the South China Sea. On October 29, Xangsane reached its peak intensity, with 10-minute sustained winds of 140 km/h (87 mph), 1-minute sustained winds of 165 km/h (103 mph) and a minimum barometric pressure of 960 hPa (28 inHg). The storm paralleled the eastern coast of Taiwan, the next day. After leaving the vicinity of Taiwan, Xangsane started to weaken as it continued to move northeastward over the East China Sea and subsequently transitioned to an extratropical cyclone, midway between the eastern coast of China and the northern Okinawa Islands, on November 1. Xangsane was responsible for 187 casualties, including 83 possibly indirectly from the crash of Singapore Airlines Flight 006 on October 31, 2000.

== Meteorological history ==
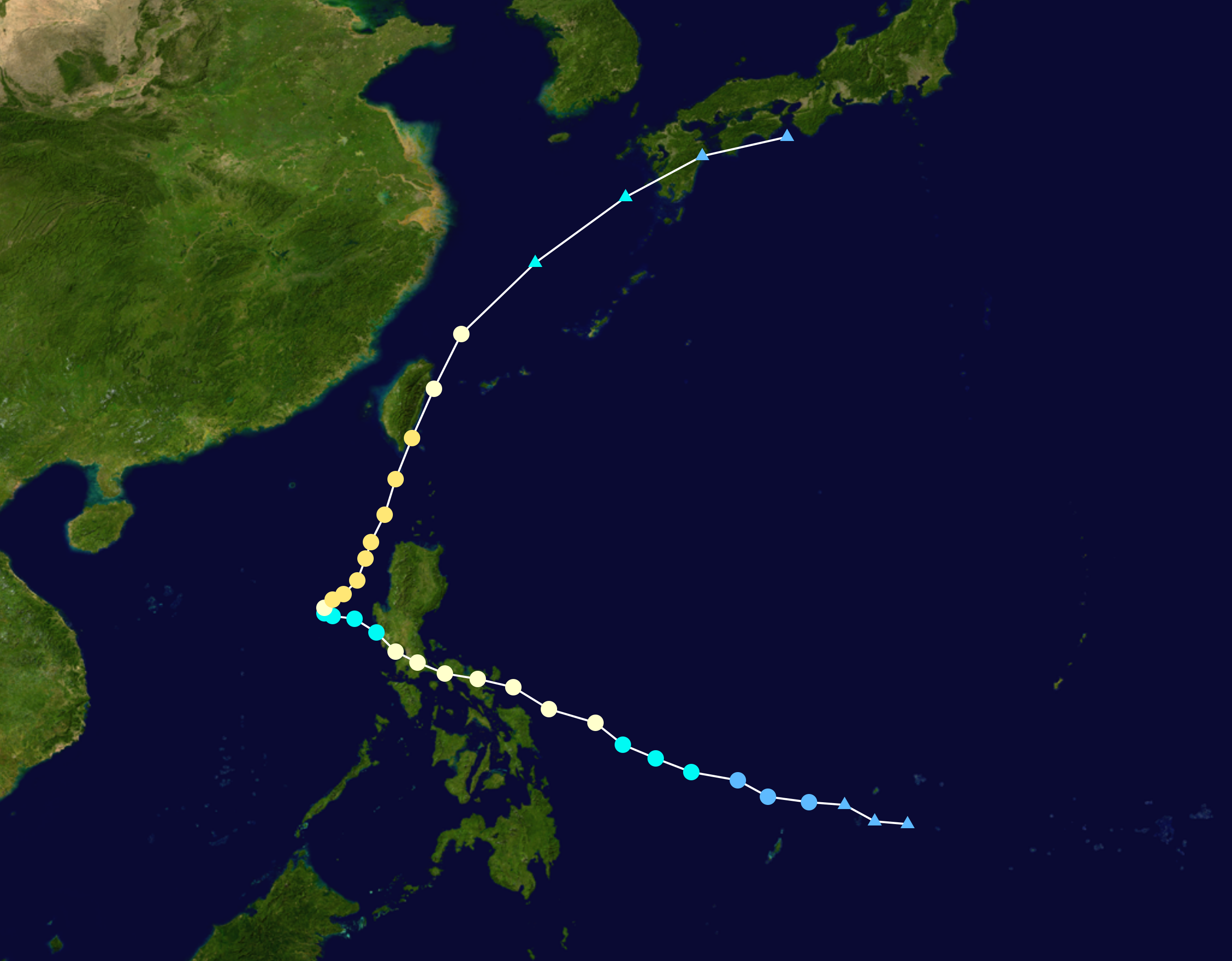
Map plotting the storm's track and intensity, according to the Saffir–Simpson scale Map key Saffir–Simpson scale Tropical depression (≤38 mph, ≤62 km/h) Tropical storm (39–73 mph, 63–118 km/h) Category 1 (74–95 mph, 119–153 km/h) Category 2 (96–110 mph, 154–177 km/h) Category 3 (111–129 mph, 178–208 km/h) Category 4 (130–156 mph, 209–251 km/h) Category 5 (≥157 mph, ≥252 km/h) Unknown Storm type Tropical cyclone Subtropical cyclone Extratropical cyclone, remnant low, tropical disturbance, or monsoon depression

On October 24, the formation of a tropical cyclone began in the waters near Palau, and on October 25, the Joint Typhoon Warning Center (JTWC), designated it 30W. The tropical cyclone then reached the surveillance area of the Philippines, so it was given the Philippine name Reming by PAGASA. After that, 30W (Reming) was named Xangsane. On October 27, Xangsane slammed into Luzon, Philippines. After leaving the Philippines, it proceeded northward and then northeastward over the South China Sea, on October 29. Over the next two days, the storm strengthened and reached its peak intensity, with 10- minute sustained winds of 140 km/h (87 mph), 1- minute sustained winds of 165 km/h (103 mph) and a minimum barometric pressure of 960 hPa (28 inHg). Before brushing past Taiwan to its east, with Taiwan getting a direct hit by the western eyewall. On November 1, Xangsane started to weaken, as it continued to move northeastward before transitioning into an extratropical cyclone in the East China Sea, at 12:00 (UTC), the same day.

== Impact ==
Xangsane brought impacts to the Manila metropolitan area. Strong winds and heavy rains occurred in Quezon, Bulacan, Zambales and Pangasinan, as well as in the Bicol region of southern Luzon. In Tayabas, Quezon, rainfall amount of 312.3 mm was observed in 24 hours. The storm killed 40 people, lost 100,000 homes, and caused damage of $27.45 million. Another storm with the same name would hit the same general area in Luzon in 2006. In Taiwan, the storm killed 64 and injured 65 people, and 25 were declared missing and caused $500 million in damages.

Xangsane was the 15th storm that approached Japan in 2000. 2000 was a rare year when the number of storms approached Japan was relatively high, even though there were no storms that made landfall in Japan.

=== Singapore Airlines Flight 006 ===
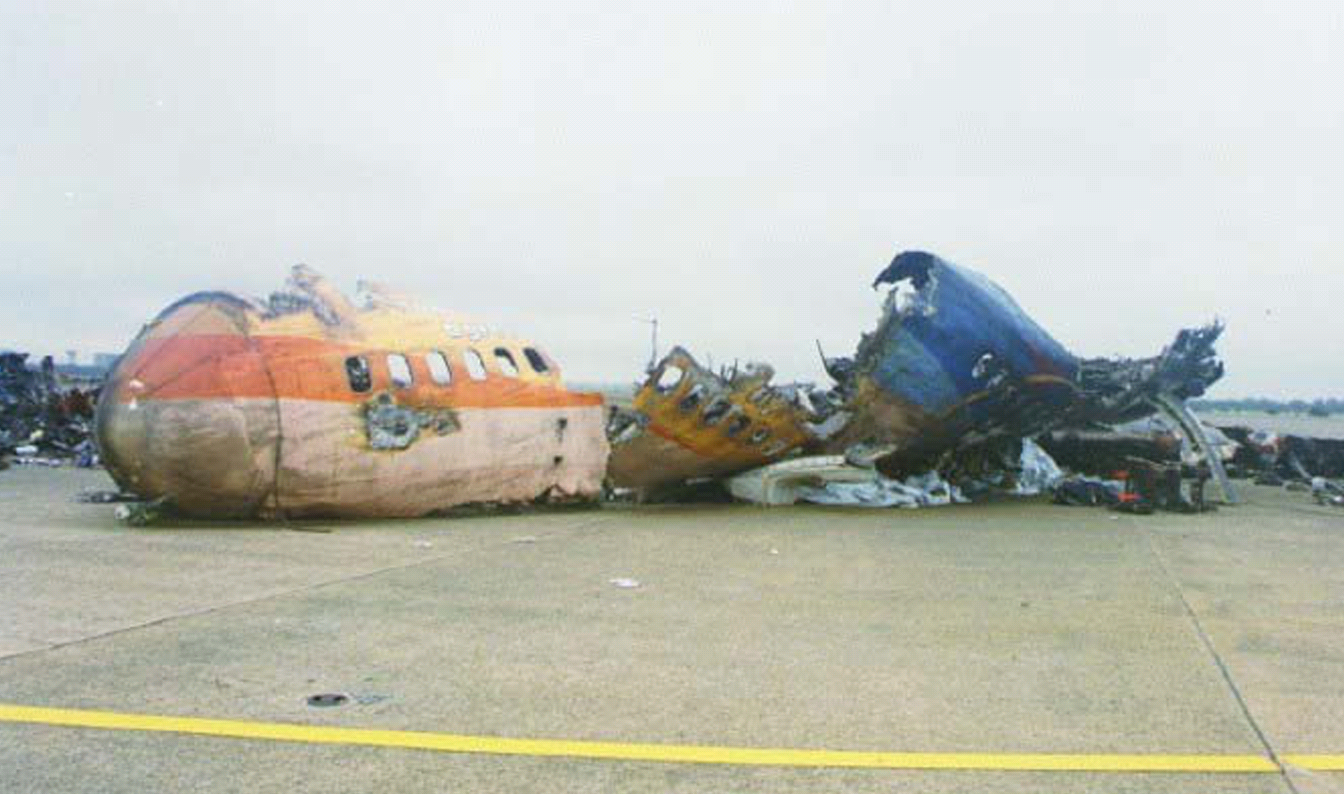
Wreckage of Singapore Airlines Flight 006

October 31, when Xangsane was approaching Taiwan, Singapore Airlines Flight 006 crashed at Chiang Kai-shek International Airport (now Taoyuan International Airport). Initially, it was suspected that the accident was due to the effect of Xangsane, but it was later discovered that the accident was due to a pilot error. However, some argue that this pilot error was due to poor visibility from Xangsane.

== See also ==
- Other tropical cyclones named Xangsane
- Other tropical cyclones named Reming
