= List of storms named Ruby =

The name Ruby has been used for fourteen tropical cyclones worldwide: twelve in the Western Pacific Ocean and once each in the Central Pacific Ocean and Australian Region.

Central Pacific:

- Hurricane Ruby (1972) (T7228, 30W) – not a threat to land

Western Pacific:

- Typhoon Ruby (1950) (T5037)
- Typhoon Ruby (1954) (T5420)
- Tropical Storm Ruby (1959) (T5901, 02W)
- Tropical Storm Ruby (1961) (T6121, 53W)
- Typhoon Ruby (1964) (T6417, 25W, Yoning) – struck near Hong Kong
- Tropical Storm Ruby (1967) (T6701, 01W, Auring)
- Tropical Storm Ruby (1970) (T7004, 04W, Emang)
- Typhoon Ruby (1976) (T7607, 07W, Huaning) – struck the Philippines and approached Japan
- Typhoon Ruby (1982) (T8205, 05W)
- Tropical Storm Ruby (1985) (T8514, 14W) – struck Japan
- Typhoon Ruby (1988) (T8828, 23W, Unsang) – affected the Philippines and Hainan Island

Named by the PAGASA:

- Typhoon Hagupit (2014) (T1422, 22W, Ruby) – struck the Philippines

The name Ruby was retired by the PAGASA following the 2014 Pacific typhoon season and was replaced with Rosita.

Australian Region:

- Cyclone Ruby (2021)
