= List of storms named Xangsane =

The name Xangsane (Lao: ຊ້າງສານ, [saːŋ˥˨ saːn˨˦]) has been used for two tropical cyclones in the western North Pacific Ocean. The name was contributed by Laos and means elephant in Lao.

- Typhoon Xangsane (2000) (T0020, 30W, Reming) – affected the Philippines and Taiwan; Singapore Airlines Flight 006 crashed during this storm
- Typhoon Xangsane (2006) (T0615, 18W, Milenyo) – lashed through the Philippines as a Category 4 typhoon, then brushed Vietnam afterwards.

The name Xangsane was retired following the 2006 Pacific typhoon season and was replaced with Leepi.
