= Bebinca =

Indo-Portuguese dessert pudding

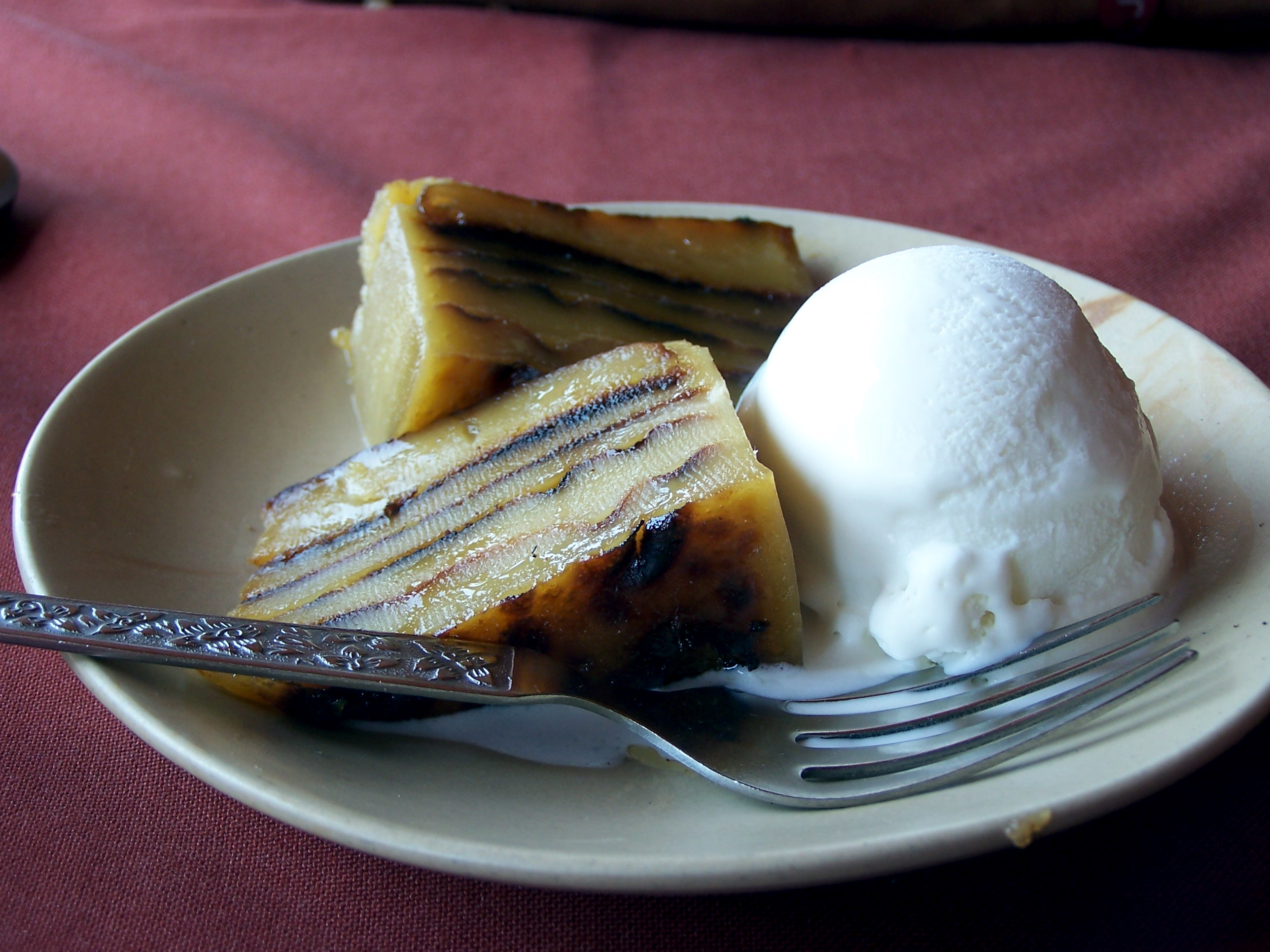
- Bebinca with ice cream
- Alternative names: Bibik
- Course: Dessert/ Sweet
- Place of origin: Estado da Índia Portuguesa
- Region or state: Goa, Kochi
- Main ingredients: Flour, sugar, ghee (clarified butter), coconut milk, egg yolk
- Food energy (per serving): 993 kcal

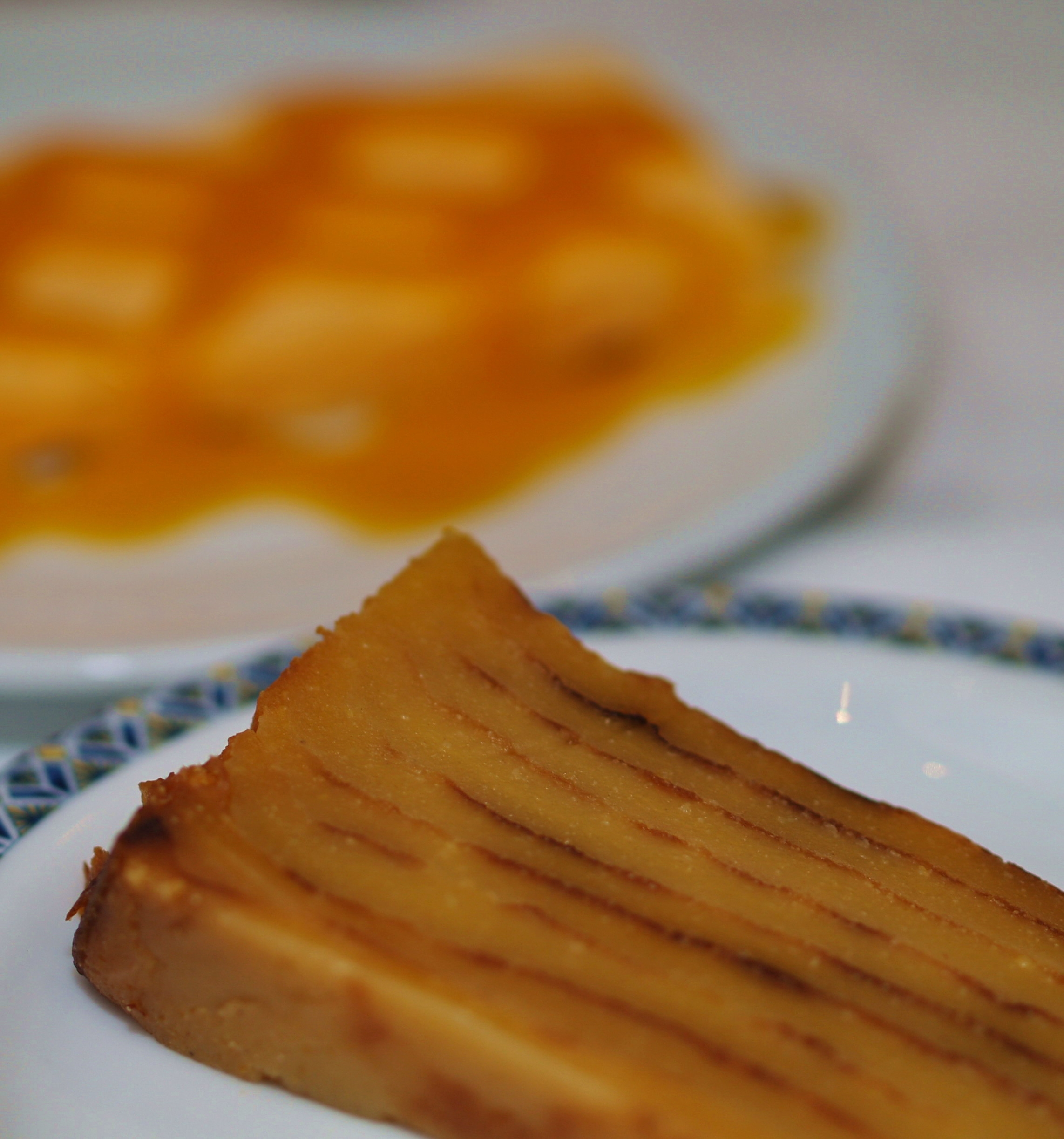
Goan bebinca in Lisbon, Portugal

Bebinca or bebinka, (Konkani; bibik) is a layer cake of Indo-Portuguese cuisine in former Estado da Índia Portuguesa, Goa. It’s also referred as Queen of Goan Desserts. In traditional baking, a bebinca has between 7 and 16 layers, but bakeries can modify the cake recipe as per convenience and taste. It is especially popular during the Christmas season, but is available all year round due to tourism in Goa. It is also easily available to carry and preserve for a long time or eaten fresh.

Bebinca was also adopted as a typhoon name in the northwestern Pacific Ocean by Macao which in Macanese means "pudding" or "cake" in general. There is also a Cochinite version Bebinca of which uses Nendran banana for its preparation and is prepared by the Luso Indian community in Kochi especially for Consoada.

== Preparation ==
Preparing bebinca is a slow process. The batter is made with flour, sugar, ghee, egg yolk, and coconut milk. The batter is spread thinly onto a grill and the layers are stacked atop one another. Bebinca may be garnished with nutmeg or slivered almonds.

== See also ==
- Pudvei
- Koswad
- Monti Fest
- Bandra Fest
- Feni (Goa)
- Bombay Sapphire
- Sanna (dish)
- Tropical Storm Bebinca
