= Singapore Airlines Flight 006 =

2000 aviation accident in Taiwan

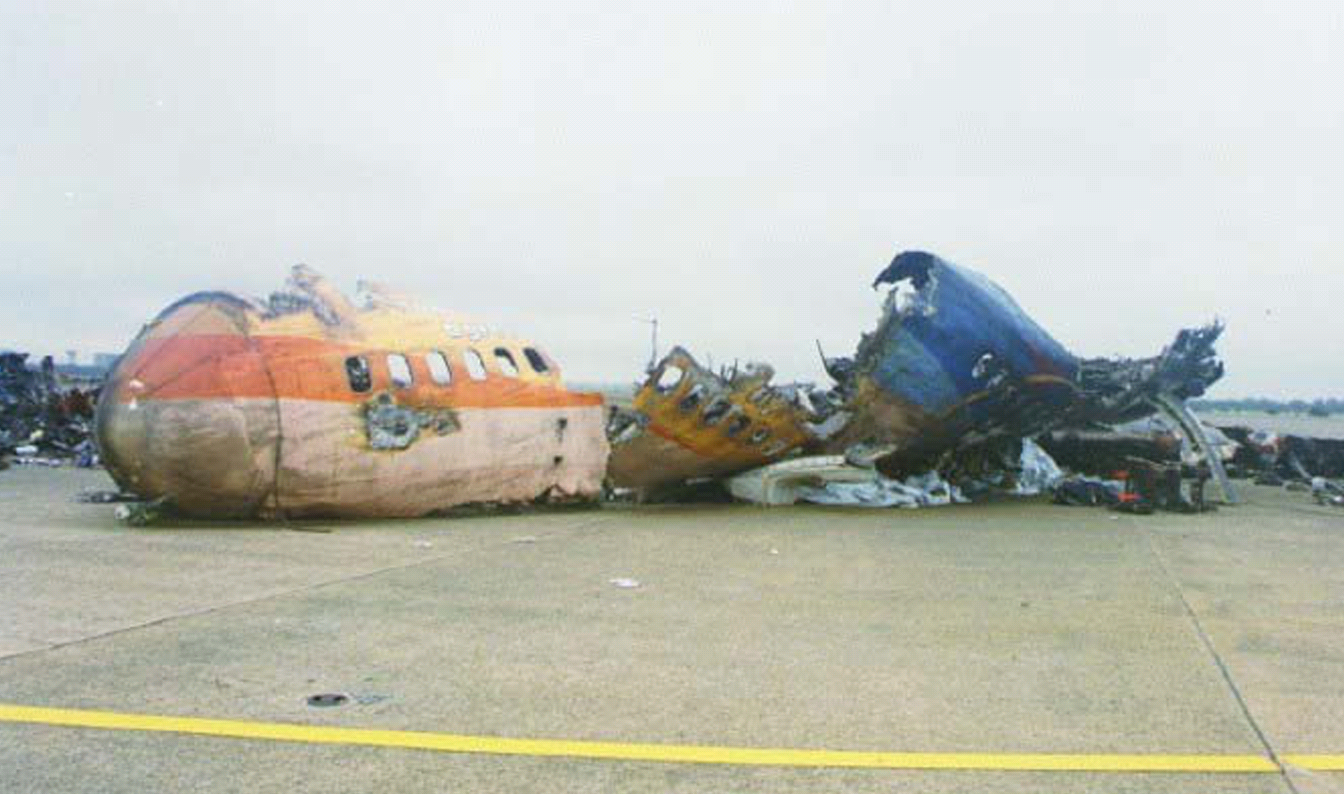
- The remains of the aircraft's forward section

Accident
- Date: 31 October 2000
- Summary: Crashed into construction equipment during takeoff on a closed runway
- Site: Taoyuan International Airport, Taoyuan, Taiwan; 25°4′35″N 121°13′26″E

Aircraft
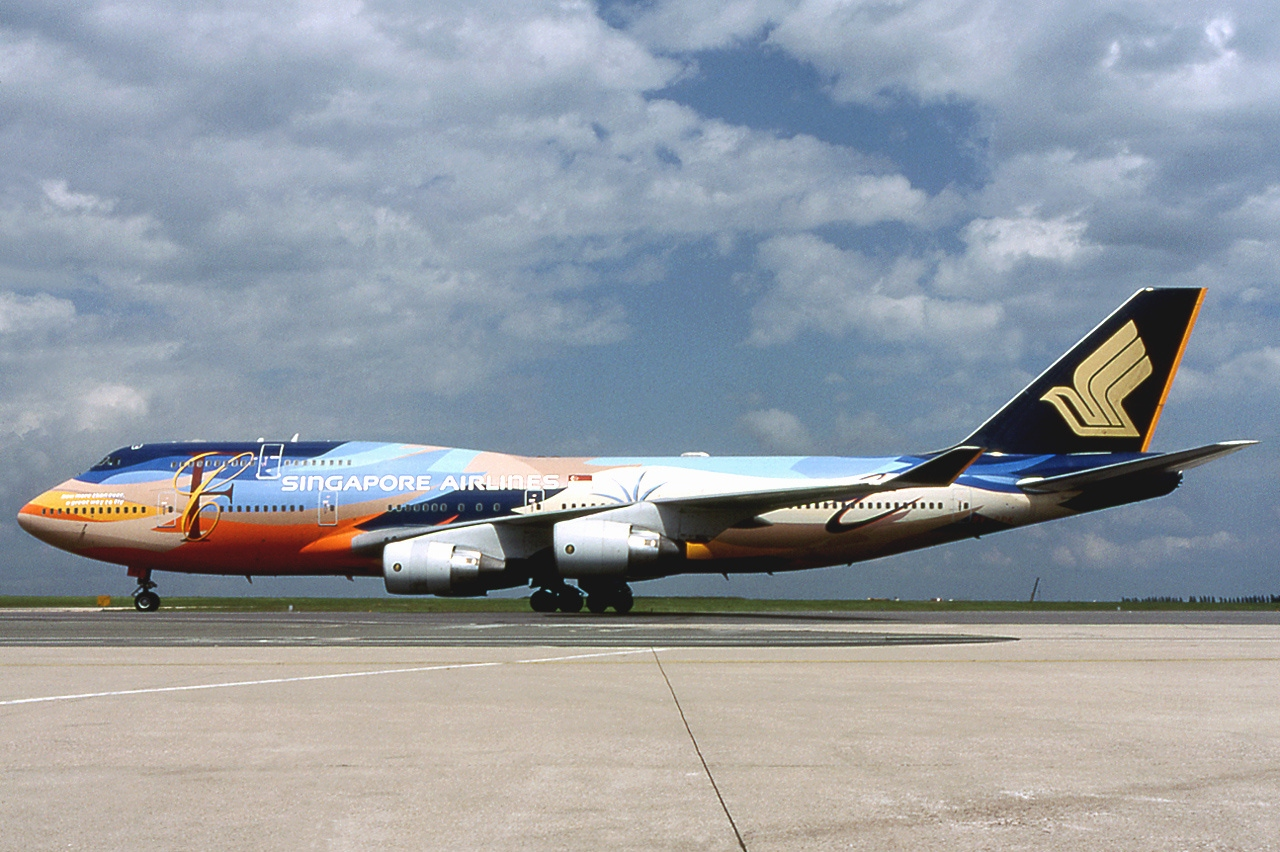
- 9V-SPK, the aircraft involved in the accident, photographed in May 2000
- Aircraft type: Boeing 747-412
- Operator: Singapore Airlines
- IATA flight No.: SQ006
- ICAO flight No.: SIA006
- Call sign: SINGAPORE 6
- Registration: 9V-SPK
- Flight origin: Changi Airport, Changi, Singapore
- Stopover: Chiang Kai-shek International Airport, Taoyuan, Taiwan
- Destination: Los Angeles International Airport, Los Angeles, California, United States
- Occupants: 179
- Passengers: 159
- Crew: 20
- Fatalities: 83
- Injuries: 71
- Survivors: 96

Singapore Airlines Flight 006 was an international scheduled passenger flight from Singapore Changi Airport to Los Angeles International Airport, United States, via Chiang Kai-shek International Airport (now known as Taoyuan International Airport) near Taipei, Taiwan. On 31 October 2000, at 23:18 Taipei local time (14:18 UTC), the Boeing 747-400 operating the flight crashed into construction equipment during a typhoon. The disaster resulted in 83 fatalities among the 179 people aboard the aircraft, with 98 occupants initially surviving the impact before two passengers later succumbed to their injuries in the hospital. This was the first fatal accident involving a Boeing 747-400 and the first fatal crash in the history of Singapore Airlines.

While the official investigation by Taiwan's Aviation Safety Council attributed the crash to flight crew error, a report by Singapore's Ministry of Transport disputed this finding, arguing that systemic failures in air traffic control (ATC) and airport infrastructure were the primary causes. This position was supported by the International Federation of Air Line Pilots' Associations (IFALPA), among other aviation organisations. The Singaporean analysis emphasised that controllers cleared the aircraft for takeoff despite lacking operational ground radar and facing a blocked line of sight. Furthermore, the report highlighted critical airport oversight deficiencies, including the absence of physical barriers or hazard markings on the closed runway, alongside active taxiway lighting that inadvertently guided the pilots into the construction zone.

== Background ==
=== Aircraft ===
The aircraft involved was a Boeing 747-412, registered as 9V-SPK, powered by four Pratt & Whitney PW4056 engines. It was the 1,099th Boeing 747 built and its first flight was on 12 January 1997. The aircraft performed its last maintenance check on 16 September 2000 and had no defects during the inspection and at the time of the accident.

=== Crew ===
The pilot-in-command of the aircraft was Captain Foong Chee Kong (Note: simplified Chinese: 方志刚; traditional Chinese: 方志剛; pinyin: Fāng Zhìgāng; Pha̍k-fa-sṳ: Fong Chṳ-kông) (41), a Malaysian. He was an experienced pilot with a total of 11,235 flight hours, of which 2,017 were logged on the Boeing 747-400 aircraft. The co-pilot, First Officer Cyrano Latiff (Note: In this Malay name, there is no surname or family name. The name Latiff is a patronymic, and the person should be referred to by his given name, Cyrano.) (36), a Singaporean, had logged 2,442 total flight hours, including 552 hours on the Boeing 747-400. The third and non-operating crew member for this sector was a relief pilot, First Officer Ng Kheng Leng (Note: simplified Chinese: 黄庆龙; traditional Chinese: 黃慶龍; pinyin: Huáng Qìnglóng; Pe̍h-ōe-jī: N̂g Khèng-lêng) (38), a Singaporean, with about 5,508 total flight hours, including 4,518 hours on the Boeing 747-400.

== Accident ==
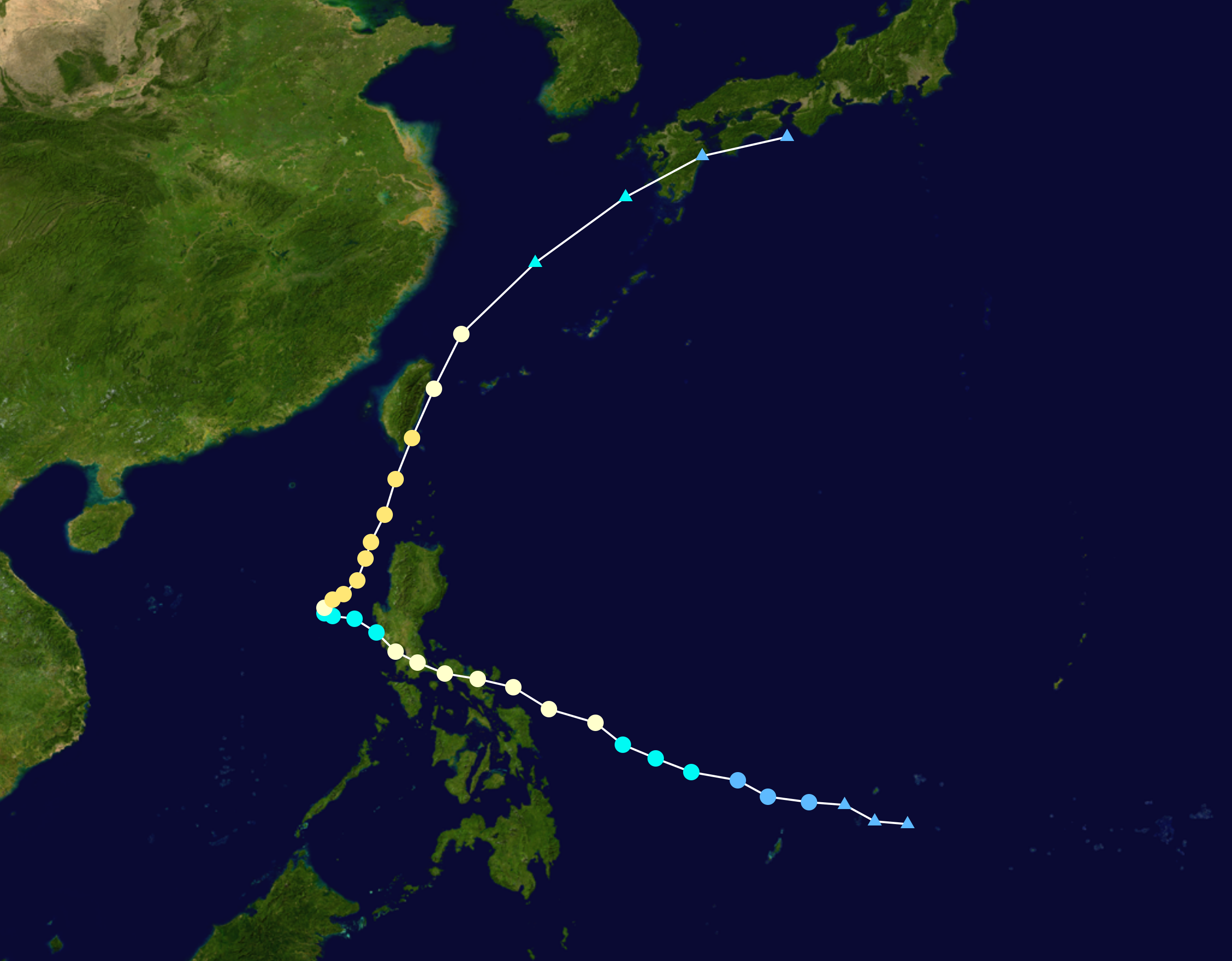
Diagram of Typhoon Xangsane's path

At 23:00 Taipei local time (14:00 UTC) on 31 October 2000, the aircraft left Bay B5 of Chiang Kai-shek International Airport during heavy rain caused by Typhoon Xangsane. At 23:05:57, ground control cleared the aircraft to taxi to runway 05L via taxiways SS, WC, and NP. At 23:15:22, the aircraft was cleared for takeoff on runway 05L.

After a six-second hold, at 23:16:36, the crew attempted takeoff on runway 05R — which had been closed for repairs — instead of the assigned runway 05L (which ran parallel to 05R). The captain correctly acknowledged that he needed to take off on 05L, but he turned the aircraft 215 m (705 ft) too soon and lined up on 05R. The airport was not at the time equipped with ASDE, which is a ground radar that enables air traffic controllers to detect potential runway conflicts by providing very detailed coverage of movement on both runways and taxiways.

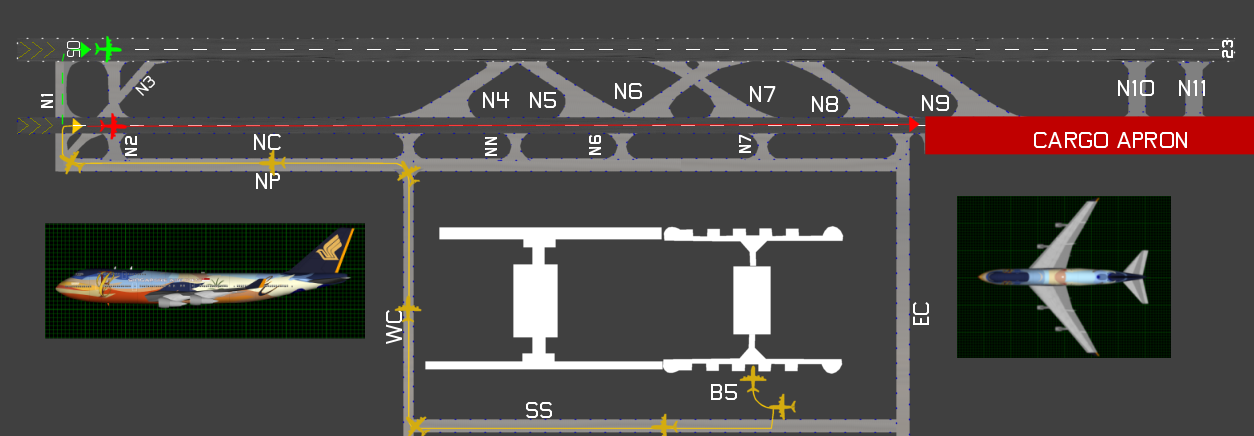
Diagram of Chiang Kai-shek International Airport and the taxi path of SQ006: The dotted green line indicates the intended route to Runway 05L. The yellow arrow indicates the path to Runway 05R. The red path is the way the pilots went.

Because visibility was poor in the heavy rain, the pilots did not see the construction equipment, including two excavators, two vibrating rollers, one small bulldozer, and one air compressor, parked on runway 05R. In addition, the runway contained concrete Jersey barriers and pits. About 41 seconds after applying full throttle, the aircraft collided with the machinery and broke into three major pieces. The fuselage was torn in two, and the engines and landing gear then separated. A crane tore the left wing from the aircraft, forcing the aircraft back onto the ground. The nose struck a scoop loader, causing a large fire, which destroyed the forward section of the fuselage and the wings. 77 of 159 passengers and four of 20 crew members died at the site of the accident. Many of the dead were seated in the middle section of the aircraft. The fuel stored in the wings exploded and incinerated that section. At 23:17:36, the emergency bell sounded and 41 firefighting vehicles, 58 ambulances, 9 lighting units, and 436 personnel were dispatched to assist survivors and extinguish the fire. Chemical extinguishing agents were deployed on the aircraft approximately three minutes after the impact. At 23:35, the fire was brought under control. At 23:40, nonairport ambulances and emergency vehicles from other agencies congregated at the north gate. At 00:00 Taipei time on 1 November, the fire was mostly extinguished and the front part of the aircraft was destroyed. Authorities established a temporary command centre.

== Casualties ==
Rescuers retrieving a body from the wreckage

At the time of the crash, 179 passengers and crew, including three children and three infants, were on the aircraft. Of the 179 occupants, 83 were killed, 39 suffered from serious injuries, and 32 had minor injuries, while 25 were uninjured. Four crew members and 77 passengers died on impact immediately after the crash and two passengers died at hospital. Most of the passengers onboard the flight were from the US, Taiwan, Singapore or India.

=== Nationalities of passengers and crew ===
Nationality	Passengers			Crew			Total		
Nationality	Total	Died	Survived	Total	Died	Survived	Total	Died	Survived
Australia	1	0	1	0	0	0	1	0	1
Cambodia	1	0	1	0	0	0	1	0	1
Canada	1	0	1	0	0	0	1	0	1
Germany	1	0	1	0	0	0	1	0	1
India	11	10	1	0	0	0	11	10	1
Indonesia	5	1	4	0	0	0	5	1	4
Ireland	1	0	1	0	0	0	1	0	1
Japan	1	1	0	0	0	0	1	1	0
Malaysia	8	4	4	1 (Note: The captain.)	0	1	9	4	5
Mexico	3	0	3	0	0	0	3	0	3
Netherlands	1	1	0	0	0	0	1	1	0
New Zealand	2	0	2	0	0	0	2	0	2
Philippines	1	1	0	0	0	0	1	1	0
Singapore	11	8	3	17	4	13	28	12	16
Spain	1	0	1	0	0	0	1	0	1
Taiwan	55	26	29	2	0	2	57	26	31
Thailand	2	0	2	0	0	0	2	0	2
United Kingdom	4	2	2	0	0	0	4	2	2
United States	47	24	23	0	0	0	47	24	23
Vietnam	2	1	1	0	0	0	2	1	1
Total	159	79	80	20	4	16	179	83	96

=== Passenger and crew origins and injuries ===
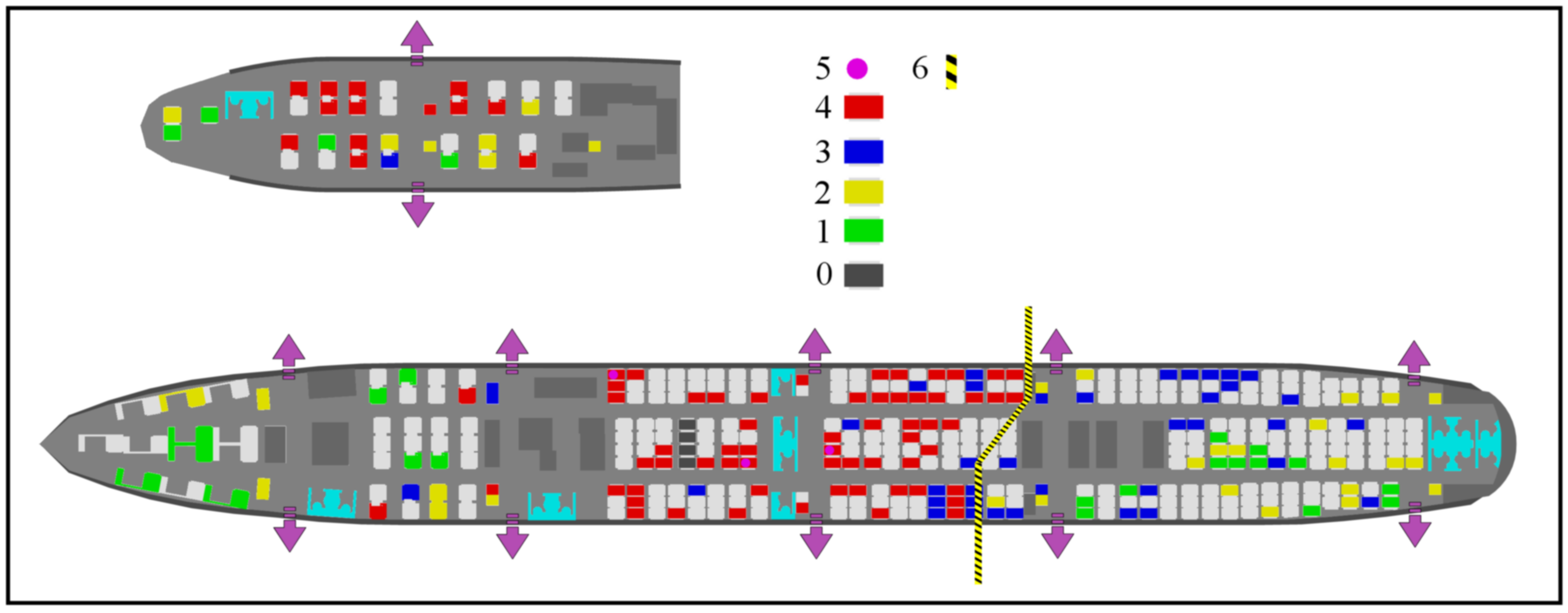
Diagram of 9V-SPK illustrating crew and passenger seat locations, lack of injury, severity of injuries, and deaths

The captain, co-pilot, and relief pilot originated from Singapore on another SQ006 flight the day before the accident, rested at a hotel in Taipei, and boarded SQ006 on 31 October. All three flight crew members survived the crash. The pilot and relief pilot sustained no injuries, while the co-pilot received minor injuries. Of the 17 cabin crew members, four died, four received serious injuries, and 9 received minor injuries. Of the passengers, 79 died, 34 received serious injuries, 22 received minor injuries, and 24 were uninjured. A total of 83 fatalities and 96 survivors out of the 179 occupants.

The flight carried five first-class passengers, 28 business-class passengers (9 on lower deck and 19 on upper deck), and 126 economy-class passengers. Of the first-class passengers, one received a minor injury and four received no injuries. Of the business-class passengers, 14 (two on lower deck, 12 on upper deck) died, two (one on lower deck, one on upper deck) received serious injuries, seven (two on lower deck, five on upper deck) received minor injuries, and eight (four on lower deck, four on upper deck) were uninjured. Of the economy-class passengers, 65 died, 33 received serious injuries, 14 received minor injuries, and 11 were uninjured. The lower-deck passengers who died were seated in rows 22 through 38. 64 of 76 passengers in the forward economy section were killed by the explosion of the centre fuel tank, which resulted in an intense fire. In the upper deck of the business-class section, 12 of 19 passengers and one of two flight attendants died from smoke inhalation and fire; 10 bodies, originating from the upper deck of business class, were found between the stairwell and the 2L exit on the main deck. All passengers in the aft economy section survived.

Of the passengers on the continuing sector to Los Angeles, 77 flew from Singapore and 82 flew from Taipei. Of the passengers originating from Singapore, 37 died. Of the passengers originating from Taipei, 42 died. Three male passengers identified as infants all died, including two Indians originating from Singapore and one Taiwanese originating from Taipei.

The Department of Forensic Pathology Institute of Foreign Medicine, Ministry of Justice performed seven autopsies. One person died from impact injuries, and six people died from severe burns. Many passengers on the flight sustained burns due to jet fuel splashing onto them.

A 45-year-old Taiwanese passenger with over 86% burns died of his injuries at Linkou Chang Gung Memorial Hospital, Linkou, Taipei County (now New Taipei City) on Sunday 5 November 2000. A 30-year-old Singaporean woman who suffered 95% burns died in a Taiwanese hospital on 24 November 2000.

Among the Singaporeans who died were the mother of a Singapore Turf Club horse trainer; an assistant professor of the National University of Singapore's Department of Computer Science and his wife; and a Republic of Singapore Air Force pilot on his way to attend the Advanced Fighter Weapons Instructor Course organised by the Air National Guard. In addition, four of the dead were Motorola employees. One of the cabin crew members who died in the crash was Surash Anandan, a former Singapore national footballer and brother of Subhas Anandan, a prominent criminal lawyer in Singapore.

Among passengers of other nationalities were the president and two vice-presidents of Buena Park, California-based Ameripec Inc. A professor at UC Davis survived the crash with 12% second-degree burns. William Wang, who later founded Vizio, suffered carbon monoxide poisoning, but survived.

John Diaz, who at the time was an executive at MP3.com, suffered lung damage and "body shock", which resulted in compressed joints with soft-tissue damage. When he appeared on The Oprah Winfrey Show, he used a walking frame.

== Initial notification of details ==
Immediately after the accident occurred, a Singapore Airlines spokesperson in Los Angeles stated that no fatalities had occurred in the crash. However, the airline's headquarters in Singapore later corrected the statement to confirm fatalities. The airline also initially denied reports that the aircraft had used the wrong runway, but retracted this claim as further details emerged.

== Investigation findings ==
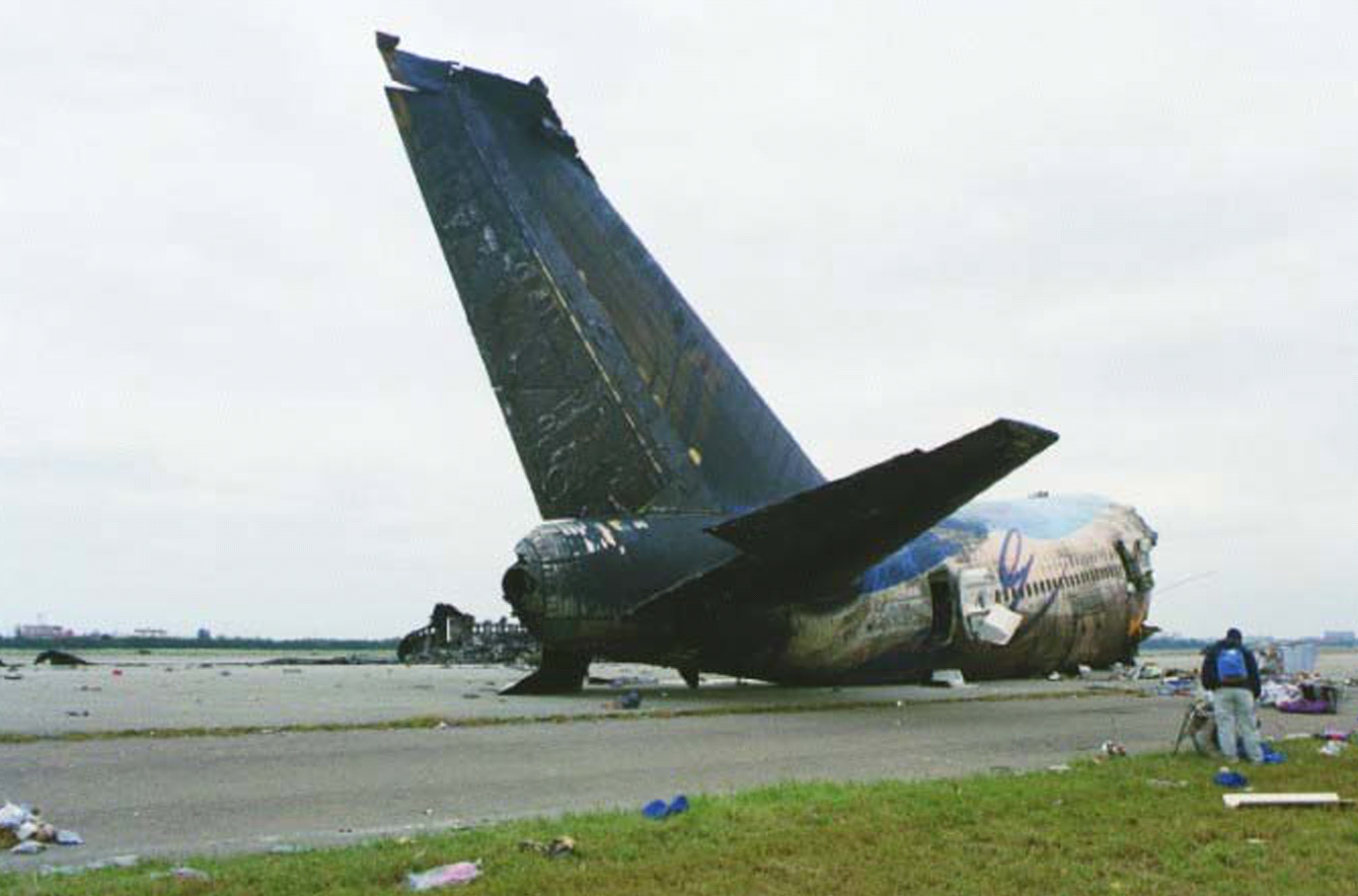
The broken-off tail section of 9V-SPK

An investigation into the accident was conducted by the Aviation Safety Council (ASC) of Taiwan. The final report was issued by the ASC on 24 April 2002. The report section "Findings Related to Probable Causes", which detailed factors that played a major role in the circumstances leading to the accident, stated that the flight crew did not review the taxi route, despite having all the relevant charts, and as a result did not know the aircraft had entered the wrong runway. Upon entering the wrong runway, the flight crew had neglected to check the paravisual display and the primary flight display, which would have indicated that the aircraft was lined up on the wrong runway. According to the ASC, these errors, coupled with the imminent arrival of the typhoon and the poor weather conditions, caused the flight crew to lose situational awareness and led them to attempt to take off from the wrong runway.

A relative whose sister and parents died in the SQ006 accident criticised the airline for taking too much time to notify relatives. A counselling centre opened at Los Angeles International Airport to deal with relatives of passengers. In Taipei, relatives of victims provided blood samples to identify bodies.

=== Contesting investigation findings ===
The report by Taiwan's ASC was deemed controversial by Singapore's Ministry of Transport, Singapore Airlines, and the International Federation of Air Line Pilots' Associations (IFALPA), among others.

Singaporean officials protested that the report did not present a full account of the incident and was incomplete, as responsibility for the accident appeared to have been placed mainly on the flight crew of SQ006, while other equally valid contributing factors had been played down. The team from Singapore that participated in the investigation felt that the lighting and signage at the airport did not measure up to international standards. Some critical lights were missing or not working. No barriers or markings were put up at the start of the closed runway, which would have alerted the flight crew that they were on the wrong runway. The Singapore team felt that these two factors were given less weight than was proper, as another flight crew had almost made the same mistake of using runway 05R to take off days before the accident.

Singapore Airlines reiterated the points brought up by the Singapore investigators and added that the air traffic controller did not follow their own procedure when they gave clearance for SQ006 to take off despite not being able to see the aircraft. Singapore Airlines also clarified that the paravisual display was meant to help the flight crew maintain the runway centreline in poor visibility, rather than to identify the runway in use.

The statement by Kay Yong (Chinese: 戎凱; pinyin: Rēng Kǎi), managing director of the Republic of China's Aviation Safety Council, implied that pilot error played a major role in the crash of the Boeing 747-400, which led to the deaths of 83 people. He stated that the airport should have placed markers stating that the runway was closed to takeoffs and landings.

Runway 05R was not blocked off by barriers because part of the strip was used by landing planes to taxi back to the airport terminal. The pilot confirmed twice with the control tower that he was on the correct runway; controllers did not know the plane had actually gone on to the wrong runway because the airport lacked ground radar and the plane was out of sight of the tower at the time of its takeoff attempt.

== Actions of flight crew and flight attendants ==
One survivor of the accident stated in a USA Today article that some of the cabin crew were unable to help the passengers escape from the aircraft because they were frozen by fear or lack of competence in emergency procedures; he was seated in the upper-deck business-class area. The Straits Times carried reports of flight attendants saving lives of passengers. One story from the newspaper stated that a flight attendant initially escaped the crash, but she ran back into the aircraft to attempt to save passengers, and died.

The Australian reported that some flight attendants helped passengers, while some flight attendants fled the aircraft before all passengers were accounted for. The New Paper stated that the pilots attempted to help the passengers.

The Taiwanese report stated that the relief pilot (crew member 3, or CM-3) said in an interview that he was the first to leave the cockpit and the last to leave the aircraft. A passenger sitting in seat 17A stated that the right upper-deck door flight attendant directed him to the main deck via the stairs; the flight attendant later died.

Upper deck passengers and flight attendants stated that the chief flight attendant went upstairs after the first impact and later died. The 3R and 3L flight attendants also died; they were seated in the middle of the aircraft.

== Aftermath ==
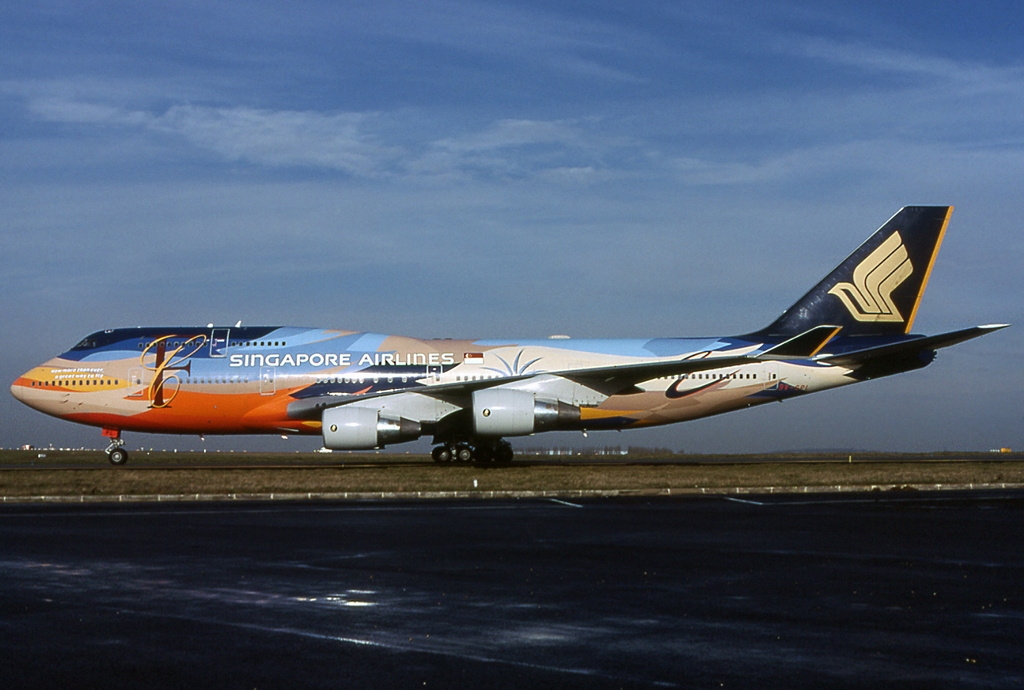
9V-SPL, sister plane to the accident aircraft, still wearing the "Tropical" livery in November 2000

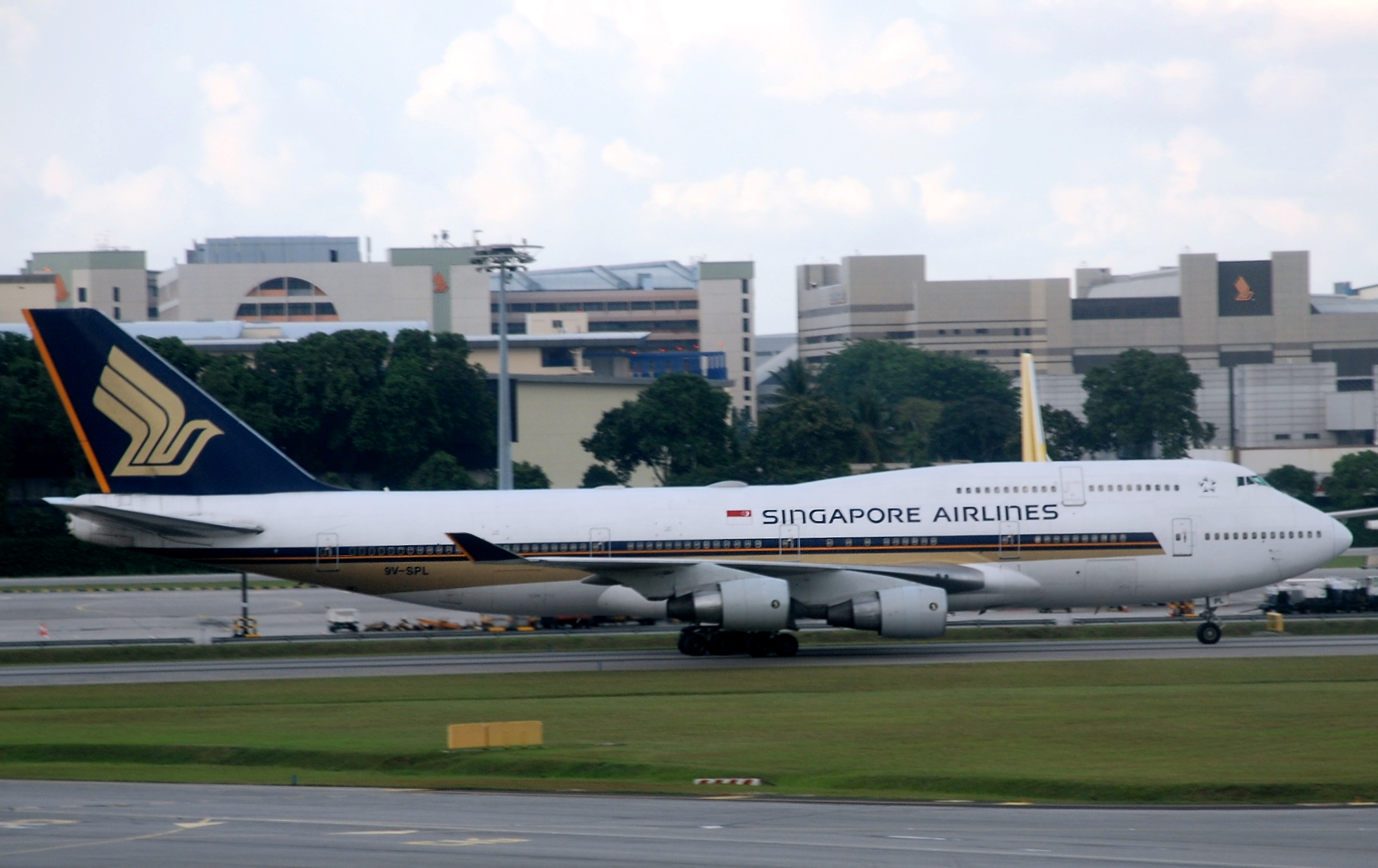
The aforementioned plane after being repainted to the standard livery.

The accident aircraft 9V-SPK was one of two 747-400s painted in a special livery called "Rainbow" (commonly referred to as "Tropical" or "Tropical Megatop") at the time of the accident. The livery was unveiled in September 1998 in conjunction with the launch of Singapore Airlines' latest cabin product and service offerings across all of the airline's travel classes at the time. After the accident, 9V-SPL, the other aircraft painted in this livery, was removed from service and repainted in the standard Singapore Airlines livery. Only after 15 years did the airline introduce another special livery, this time on two of its Airbus A380s in conjunction with Singapore's 50th National Day celebrations.

About two weeks after the accident, Singapore Airlines changed the Singapore–Taipei–Los Angeles route flight number from SQ006 to SQ30. The return flight to Singapore, SQ005, was also changed to SQ29.

After the release of the ASC report, Republic of China (ROC) public prosecutors called upon the flight crew of SQ006 to return to the ROC for questioning and the three-member crew complied. Rumours abounded at the time that the pilots might be detained in the ROC and charged with negligence. IFALPA had previously stated that it would advise its members of the difficulties of operating into the ROC if the flight crew of SQ006 were prosecuted. The prosecutors did not press charges and the flight crew were allowed to leave the ROC.

Despite a Taiwanese prosecutor's decision in 2002 to suspend criminal charges against the pilots, and Singaporean authorities defending the crew's actions, Singapore Airlines still terminated the captain and first officer. Because the investigation concluded pilot error caused the crash, prosecutors held the legal grounds to indict them for manslaughter; instead, they granted a conditional suspension of the indictment, dropping the case after three years on the condition that the pilots complete community service. Meanwhile, the relief first officer retained his job, as he was not at the controls during the incident.

Singapore Airlines offered immediate financial relief of US$5,000 to each survivor a few days after the incident. Singapore Airlines also offered US$400,000 to the families of each of the dead. However, more than 30 survivors and families of the dead rejected the offer and sued Singapore Airlines for higher damages. Forty lawsuits were filed against Singapore Airlines in Singapore while more than 60 passenger lawsuits were filed in the United States. All the lawsuits were settled out of court.

The Association of Asian American Yale Alumni named a Community Service Fellowship program after Tina Eugenia Yeh, an alumna who perished in the accident.

=== Repatriation of bodies ===
By 8 November 2000, several bodies were scheduled to be repatriated. Of the bodies:

- 19, including 14 Americans, 3 Taiwanese, and 2 Indians, were repatriated to the United States.
- 13, including 11 Singaporeans, 1 British, and 1 American, were repatriated to Singapore.
- 10, including 8 Indians and 2 Americans, were repatriated to India.
- 4 were repatriated to Malaysia.
- 3 Americans were repatriated to Canada.
- 1 was repatriated to Indonesia.
- 1 was repatriated to Japan.
- 1 was repatriated to the Netherlands.
- 1 was repatriated to the United Kingdom.
- 1 was repatriated to Vietnam.

The bodies of 14 Taiwanese passengers and the others remained in Taipei to be collected by relatives.

=== Hospitalisation and release of survivors ===
By 2 November 2000, 40 passengers and crew were hospitalised, 11 of whom were released later that night. On 5 November 2000, 34 passengers and crew remained hospitalised. 64 were discharged from the hospitals. A Taiwanese passenger died the same day. On 8 November 2000, 24 passengers and crew remained hospitalised: 20 in Taiwan, 3 in Singapore and 1 in the United States. The Republic of Singapore Air Force deployed a specially configured Boeing KC-135R for the medical evacuation of critical Singaporean victims; 73 survivors, 40 of whom were not hospitalised, and 33 of whom were discharged, had either returned home or continued with their travel.

== In popular culture ==
The accident and its subsequent investigation process was dramatised into a documentary titled as "Caution to the Wind" as the third episode of the twelfth season of the Canadian TV series Mayday (also known as Air Crash Investigation). A movie titled as Thread That Binds includes an interview with a surviving flight attendant.

== See also ==
- Aviation safety
- Aeroflot Flight 3352
- China Airlines Flight 204, another wrong-runway takeoff
- Comair Flight 5191 crashed near Lexington, Kentucky, after using the wrong runway for takeoff.
