= List of named storms (C) =

Storms are named for historical reasons to avoid confusion when communicating with the public, as more than one storm can exist at a time. Names are drawn in order from predetermined lists. For tropical cyclones, names are assigned when a system has one-, three-, or ten-minute winds of more than 65 km/h (40 mph). Standards, however, vary from basin to basin. For example, some tropical depressions are named in the Western Pacific, while within the Australian and Southern Pacific regions, the naming of tropical cyclones are delayed until they have gale-force winds occurring more than halfway around the storm center.

This list covers the letter C.

== Storms ==
Note: † indicates the name was retired after that usage in the respective basin

- Caboto (1984) – a moderate tropical storm that crossed Madagascar.
- Caiobá (2026) – one of two subtropical systems that simultaneously existed in the South Atlantic Ocean.
- Caitlin

- 1991 – relieved a drought on Okinawa and killed 18 in Korea and the Philippines.
- 1994 – strong tropical storm that killed 8 people in China, with 9 missing.

- Calasanjy (1989) – a tropical cyclone that made landfall on Madagascar.
- Caleb (2017) – a Category 1 tropical cyclone north of the Cocos Islands.
- Calidera (1988) – a tropical cyclone that crossed Madagascar.
- Caloy

- 2002 – a tropical depression that was only recognized by PAGASA and JTWC.
- 2006 – struck the Philippines and China.
- 2010 – PAGASA name for Typhoon Chanthu which struck China.
- 2014 – a weak tropical depression.
- 2018 – a Category 4 typhoon that affected a few Pacific islands.
- 2022 – a typhoon that affected Southern China in July 2022.
- 2026 – a weak tropical storm that minimally affected Yap.

- Calvin

- 1981 – briefly threatened Baja California Sur.
- 1987 – did not make landfall.
- 1993 – killed 37 people in Mexico.
- 1999 – storm was over open waters so there were no reports of deaths or damage.
- 2005 – briefly threatened Acapulco but moved away.
- 2011 – stayed off the coast of Mexico.
- 2017 – minimal tropical storm that made landfall in southwestern Mexico.
- 2023 – a Category 3 hurricane that passed south of Hawaii as a tropical storm.

- Calvinia (2019) – a tropical cyclone that affected Mauritius.
- Cam

- 1996 – no threat to land.
- 1999 – minimal disruption in Hong Kong.

- Camilla (1949) – a strong category 2 typhoon made landfall Northern Philippines.
- Camille

- 1969† – was the second most intense tropical cyclone on record to strike the United States (behind the 1935 Labor Day hurricane) and is one of just four Category 5 hurricanes to make landfall in the U.S.
- 1975 – a strong tropical cyclone that made landfall to Madagascar in January 1975.

- Candice

- 1976 – a powerful category 1 hurricane passed off the coast of the United States and Atlantic Canada.
- 2024 – a severe tropical storm which affected Mauritius.

- Cari (2015) – a subtropical storm in the South Atlantic.
- Carina

- 2006 – a Category 4 tropical cyclone in the South Indian Ocean that only slightly affected Madagascar.
- 2012 – affected South China and Taiwan as a tropical storm.
- 2016 – a severe tropical storm that made landfall over South China.
- 2020 – a weak system that threatened no land areas.
- 2024 – a powerful typhoon that impacted Taiwan and East China, and also drenched western Luzon in the Philippines by enhancing the monsoonal flow.

- Carla

- 1956 – produced gale-force winds over New England.
- 1961† – second most intense storm to ever strike the Texas coast; caused over $2 billion (2005 US dollars) in damages
- 1962 – landfall on Hainan Island; at least 13 people were killed
- 1965 –
- 1967 – hit Taiwan, showering record rainfall amounts on the island, killing 69 people
- 1971 –
- 1974 –
- 1977 – hit Vietnam.

- Carlos

- 1979 – did not make landfall
- 1985 – did not affect land
- 1991 – no damage reports
- 1997 – never threatened land; no casualties or damage were reported
- 2003 – damaged about 30,000 houses in Mexico, with a monetary damage total of 86.7 million pesos (2003 MXN, $8 million 2003 USD)
- 2009 – did not affect land
- 2011† – a severe tropical cyclone bringing heavy rainfall over Northern Australia where a record three-day total of 684.8 mm (26.96 in) rain was recorded at Darwin International Airport
- 2015 – a small tropical cyclone which brushed the western coast of Mexico
- 2017 – a tropical cyclone that persisted off the coast of Madagascar
- 2021 - a weak tropical cyclone that churned open at sea

- Carlotta

- 1967 – formed near the Mexican coast; did not make landfall.
- 1971 – no land was affected.
- 1972† – a severe tropical cyclone that affected the Solomon Islands, Vanuatu and New Caledonia.
- 1975 – did not come near land.
- 1978 – category 4 hurricane that did not affect land; at the time, it was the third strongest June storm, after 1973's Ava and 1976's Annette.
- 1982 – did not make landfall.
- 1988 – did not make landfall.
- 1994 – buffeted Socorro Island with sustained winds of 39 mph (63 km/h).
- 2000 – killed 18 after sinking a freighter.
- 2006 – brought light rainfall to Mexico.
- 2012 – made landfall near Puerto Escondido, Mexico.
- 2018 – brushed the southwestern coast of Mexico without making landfall.
- 2024 – Category 1 hurricane that stayed at sea.

- Carmen

- 1949 – a category 2 typhoon that affected the Philippines in mid-January.
- 1952 – a category 3 typhoon that passed off the coast of the Philippines and Japan.
- 1957 – made landfall in southern China.
- 1960 – made landfall in South Korea; 24 casualties and $2 million in damage (1960 USD).
- 1963 – a powerful Category 4 typhoon that hit the Philippines, China and Vietnam
- 1964 – a moderately severe tropical cyclone that struck the state of the Northern Territory.
- 1965 – a powerful category 5 typhoon that killed 209 people.
- 1968 (September) – not areas land.
- 1968 (December) – passed west of Rodriguez, causing heavy rains and winds.
- 1971 (September) – hit Japan.
- 1971 (November) – not areas land
- 1974 (August)† – made landfall on the Yucatán Peninsula, then crossed the Gulf of Mexico and made a second landfall in southern Louisiana; killed 8 people and caused at least $162 million (USD) in damage.
- 1974 (October) – hit Luzon just days after Typhoon Bess; second landfall on southeastern China; 25 fatalities, with damage estimated at $13 million (1974 USD).
- 1968 – a category 1 typhoon that affected China and South Korea.
- 1980 – formed in the Central Pacific
- 1983 – formed off the coast of Vietnam and moved toward the Luzon Strait; eventually absorbed into Typhoon Abby.
- 1986 – passed between Rota and Saipan.

- Carol

- 1947 – a Category 3 typhoon that passed near the Philippines and then Taiwan.
- 1953 – a Category 5 Cape Verde-type hurricane that made landfall in New Brunswick as a minimal hurricane.
- 1954† – a Category 3 hurricane that made landfall on Long Island, New York, and then in Connecticut.
- 1960 – struck Mauritius, causing 42 deaths and the second highest winds recorded in the country.
- 1965 – a long-lived Category 1 hurricane that remained in the open ocean.
- 1966 – re-designated Cyclone Daisy by Météo-France after crossing into the south-west Indian basin.
- 1972 – a severe tropical cyclone that never impacted land.
- 1976 – remained in the open ocean.
- 1980 – a severe tropical cyclone that developed southwest of Timor and moved westward through the open ocean; interacted with the weaker Cyclone Dan to its north.

- Caroline

- 1972 – a weak tropical storm affected Mozambique and South Africa.
- 1975 – was one of two tropical cyclones to affect northern Mexico during the 1975.

- Carrie

- 1957 – a long-lived Cape Verde-type system that peaked as a Category 4 major hurricane.
- 1972 – affected the Northeastern United States and the Maritime provinces of Canada.

- Cary

- 1980 – while forming, it crossed the Philippines without impact.
- 1984 – no impact on land.
- 1987 – made landfall on Luzon, Philippines, and later in northern Vietnam.

- Catarina (2004) – was an extremely rare South Atlantic tropical cyclone, the only recorded hurricane strength storm on record in the South Atlantic Ocean.
- Cathy

- 1947 – a Category 3 typhoon that made landfall Philippines and Vietnam.
- 1998 – remained in the open ocean.

- Cebile (2018) – an intense tropical cyclone that stayed away from land.
- Cecil

- 1979 – struck the Philippines; was the first tropical cyclone in the Western Pacific to be given a male name.
- 1982 – affected Taiwan, China, Korea, and Japan.
- 1985 – struck the Philippines and Vietnam.
- 1989 – made landfall in Vietnam.
- 1990 – struck China.
- 1993 – curved out to sea.

- Cecile (1962) – a severe tropical storm that passed near St. Brandon.
- Cecilia (1993) – a severe tropical storm that affected Mauritius and Réunion.
- Cela (2003) – a tropical cyclone that did not significantly affect land.
- Celeno (1995) – a rare Mediterranean tropical-like cyclone
- Celesta (1992) – a moderate tropical storm that passed near Rodriduges.
- Celeste

- 1960 – developed from the remnants of Atlantic Basin Hurricane Abby; did not make landfall.
- 1968 – did not make landfall.
- 1972 – a long-lived Category 4 hurricane that made landfall on Johnston Atoll.
- 1976 – remained in the open ocean.
- 1996† – formed in the Coral Sea and rapidly intensified into a Category 3 severe tropical cyclone (Australian scale); approached Bowen, Queensland, before moving back out to sea.

- Celestina (1985) – a severe tropical storm that affected Réunion.
- Celia

- 1962 – did not affect land.
- 1966 – struck the Bahamas.
- 1970† – formed in the Caribbean in late July, reached category 3, weakened, and restrengthened to a 125 mph storm prior to its landfall at Corpus Christi, Texas.
- 1980 – remained well offshore of Mexico.
- 1986 – remained well offshore of Mexico.
- 1992 – Category 4 storm that stayed well at sea.
- 1998 – stayed well off the coast of Mexico.
- 2004 – stayed out to sea.
- 2010 – a 160 mph Category 5 hurricane that remained offshore Mexico while at peak strength.
- 2016 – churned in the open ocean, dissipated well east of Hawaii.
- 2022 – formed off the coast of Central America and paralleled the southwestern coast of Mexico before moving out to sea.

- Celimene (1977) – a moderate tropical storm.
- Celina (2007) – a moderate tropical storm that affected Madagascar, causing one fatality.
- Celine (1979) – an intense tropical cyclone that killed about half of the population of the Rodrigues flying fox.
- Cempaka

- 2017 – a weak system that caused flooding and landslides in Indonesia.
- 2021 – a fairly long-lived cyclone that caused substantial damage in South China and Vietnam.
- 2026 – a Category 2 typhoon that churned open at sea.

- Cesar

- 1984 – moved northeast parallel to the East Coast of the United States, losing tropical characteristics near Newfoundland
- 1990 – formed west of Cape Verde but dissipated while still 1000 miles (1600 km) east of Bermuda
- 1996† – formed off Venezuela and made landfall at Nicaragua as a Category 1 storm; killed 51 (26 in Costa Rica); crossed into the Pacific Ocean and became Hurricane Douglas

- Cezera (1990) – a severe tropical storm.
- Chaba

- 2004 – a strong super typhoon that devastated Japan in 2004.
- 2010 – approached Japan.
- 2016 – a Category 5 super typhoon that affected South Korea and Japan.
- 2022 - made landfall in southwestern Guangdong province, China; 26 people were killed when an offshore crane vessel split in half during the storm and sank.

- Chalane (2020) – a tropical cyclone that affected Madagascar, Mozambique and Zimbabwe, killing only 7 people.
- Chambo (2004) – a tropical cyclone that stayed away from land.
- Champi

- 2015 – a Category 4 typhoon that affected the Mariana Islands.
- 2021 – a Category 1 typhoon that churned in the open ocean.
- 2026 – a extremely powerful Category 5 super typhoon that caused damage mainly in Mariana Islands, Taiwan, and Japan.

- Chan-hom

- 2003 – strong storm that stayed away from land.
- 2009 – formed off Vietnam, reached typhoon status before landfall in the Philippines.
- 2015 – a large typhoon which affected several countries in eastern Asia.
- 2020 – a minimal typhoon that brushed Japan.
- 2026 – an erratic tropical storm that traversed Japan westwards.

- Chanchu

- 2000 – formed from the remnants of Tropical Storm Upana.
- 2006† – a Category 4 typhoon that traversed the Philippines and then made landfall in Guangdong, China.

- Chanda (2012) – a moderate tropical storm that made landfall on Madagascar.
- Chantal

- 1961 – a tropical cyclone off the coast of Madagascar.
- 1983 – formed near Bermuda and dissipated in the open ocean.
- 1989 – formed north of the Yucatán, made landfall as a Category 1 storm in Texas, causing 13 deaths, including 10 on an oil rig construction ship off Louisiana; $100 million damage reported.
- 1995 – never threatened land, dissipated several hundred miles west of Ireland.
- 2001 – degenerated into an open wave shortly after forming, then passed over Trinidad (causing two deaths) and strengthened back into a tropical storm before striking Belize, causing $5 million damage there.
- 2007 – short-lived storm which caused moderate flooding damage in southeastern Newfoundland.
- 2013 – formed west of the Cape Verde Islands and weakened before landfall in Hispaniola.
- 2019 – meandered over the Central Atlantic without threatening land.
- 2025 – made landfall in South Carolina, moved into neighboring North Carolina where it caused heavy flooding.

- Chantelle (1996) – a severe tropical storm that did not significantly affect land.
- Chanthu

- 2004 – struck Vietnam as a severe tropical storm.
- 2010 – struck China as a Category 1 typhoon.
- 2016 – brushed the eastern coast of Japan as a severe tropical storm.
- 2021 - a category 5 super typhoon that threatened Cagayan Valley.

- Chapala (2015) – an extremely severe cyclonic storm that impacted Somalia.
- Charles (1978) – a Category 3 severe tropical cyclone that affected the Samoan Islands.
- Charley

- 1980 – Category 1 hurricane that looped across the north Atlantic Ocean without causing any reported damage in August.
- 1986 – Category 1 hurricane that made landfall along the North Carolina coast killing five; went on to hit Great Britain and Ireland as a strong extratropical storm.
- 1992 – Category 2 hurricane that drifted over the central Atlantic Ocean without affecting land in September.
- 1998 – tropical storm in August that nearly became a hurricane before weakening and making landfall near Port Aransas, Texas, causing significant flood damage to inland areas and killing 13 people.
- 2004† – destructive Category 4 storm that caused billions of dollars in damages, mostly in Southwest Florida.

- Charlie

- 1950 – Category 2 hurricane that did not affect land.
- 1951 – powerful August hurricane that struck Cozumel, Mexico, and then mainland Mexico as a Category 4 storm.
- 1952 – major hurricane that struck Santo Domingo, Dominican Republic, as a tropical storm before strengthening to a Category 3 hurricane staying well at sea.
- 1972 – a subtropical cyclone that nearly reached hurricane force as it moved out to sea.
- 1988† – struck Ayr, Queensland, in March, killing one person and leaving $2,300,000 (1988 USD) in damages.

- Charlotte

- 1946 – remained in the open ocean.
- 1952 – formed in the South China Sea and made landfall near Hong Kong.
- 1956 – made landfall in the Philippines and then in Vietnam.
- 1959 – damaging Category 5 super typhoon that remained out to sea.
- 1973 – a weak tropical storm passed southwest of Réunion, rainfall damaged crops and flooded roads, causing one person to drown.
- 2009 – a Category 1 tropical cyclone that made landfall on the Cape York Peninsula.
- 2022 – a Category 4 severe tropical cyclone that affected Indonesia and East Timor.

- Charly (2001) – an intense tropical cyclone that did not significantly affect land.
- Chataan (2002) – a strong typhoon that impacted Micronesia.
- Chebi

- 2001 – made landfall in the People's Republic of China.
- 2006 – a rapidly intensified typhoon which traversed the northern Philippines.

- Chedeng

- 2003 – struck the Philippines and Japan
- 2007 – struck Taiwan and China
- 2011 – brushed the Philippines and as a Category 3 it approached Japan
- 2015 – a strong typhoon of early 2015.
- 2019 – a tropical depression that made landfall in Mindanao.
- 2023 – churned out of the ocean without affecting any landmass.

- Chedza (2015) – a severe tropical storm that caused 80 direct fatalities when it crossed Madagascar and an additional 296 deaths were caused by its precursor in Mozambique and Malawi.
- Cheneso (2023) – a Category 2 tropical cyclone that made landfall in Madagascar.
- Chenge (2025) – remained in the open ocean.
- Cherono (2011) – a moderate tropical storm that did not significantly affect land.
- Chido (2024) – a small but powerful and deadly tropical cyclone which impacted Southeast Africa.
- Chikita (1999) – a moderate tropical storm that affected Mauritius and Réunion.
- Chloe

- 1967 – long-lived Category 2 hurricane, churned in the open ocean.
- 1971 – made landfall in Belize.
- 1984 – Category 4 severe tropical cyclone (Australian scale), made landfall near Roebourne, Western Australia.
- 1995† – Category 4 severe tropical cyclone (Australian scale), made landfall in the Kimberley region of Western Australia.

- Choi-wan

- 2003 – a Category 3 typhoon that stayed off the Japanese coast.
- 2009 – moved through the Northern Mariana Islands as a Category 5 super typhoon.
- 2015 – a large severe tropical storm that neared typhoon strength.
- 2021 – a tropical storm which caused moderate flooding and damage in the Philippines and also affected Taiwan.
- 2026 – a Category 5 super typhoon that churned in the open ocean.

- Chris

- 1948 – a tropical storm which formed near the Ryukyu Islands but eventually did not affect land.
- 1982 (January) – one of the strongest tropical cyclones in the Indian Ocean on record.
- 1982 (September) – made landfall at Sabine Pass and caused widespread flooding as far inland as Tennessee, but total damage was low.
- 1988 – caused three deaths in Puerto Rico then made landfall near Savannah, Georgia, killing one in South Carolina; monetary damage was minor.
- 1991 – a cyclone that formed off the coast of Western Australia.
- 1994 – a Category 1 hurricane that formed in mid-Atlantic, brushed Bermuda as a tropical storm, then continued north; no significant damage.
- 2000 – formed several hundred miles east of the Lesser Antilles, but dissipated a day later; no damage was reported.
- 2002† – landfall to the east of Port Hedland, Western Australia; caused some inland flooding.
- 2006 – formed about 160 miles (260 km) east of the Leeward Islands; minimal damage was reported.
- 2012 – a Category 1 hurricane that affected Bermuda.
- 2018 – a Category 2 hurricane which formed off the coast of North Carolina.
- 2024 – minimal tropical storm that made landfall in Mexico causing minimal damage.

- Christelle

- 1980 – a tropical cyclone that made landfall on Madagascar as a tropical depression.
- 1994 – a moderate tropical storm that affected Mauritius, Réunion, and Madagascar.

- Christiane (1973) – a moderate tropical storm.
- Christine

- 1964 – a strong tropical storm that affected Mozambique and then hit Madagascar.
- 1973 – as a tropical depression caused flooding in Puerto Rico.
- 2013† – a Category 4 severe tropical cyclone that made landfall on Western Australia's Pilbara coast between Karratha and Port Hedland.

- Chuck

- 1992 – made landfall on Hainan and in northern Vietnam
- 1995 – remained out to sea

- Cilida (2018) – an intense tropical cyclone that affected Mauritius.
- Cilla

- 1988 – did not affect any land.
- 2003† – a weak, short-lived tropical cyclone that affected a few South Pacific islands.

- Cimaron

- 2001 – brushed the Philippines and Taiwan
- 2006 – affected the Philippines as a Category 5 super typhoon, causing several deaths
- 2013 – struck the Philippines and China.
- 2018 – a typhoon that caused minimal impacts in the Mariana Islands and Japan.
- 2024 – a weak storm that loìtered off the coast of Japan.

- Cinda (2008) – a severe tropical storm that did not make landfall.
- Cindy

- 1959 – caused minor damage to South Carolina.
- 1963 – caused $12 million damage and three deaths in Texas and Louisiana.
- 1970 – persisted in the Gulf of Carpentaria.
- 1981 – formed between Bermuda and Nova Scotia, then moved east, ensuring it threatened no land.
- 1987 – stayed in the open sea, dissipated hundreds of miles from the Azores.
- 1993 – the tropical depression that became Cindy crossed Martinique, killing two; as a tropical storm, it made landfall on the Dominican Republic, killing two more.
- 1998 – originally named Victor in the Australian region; renamed by Mauritius as Cindy as it passed into the Southwest Indian Ocean.
- 1999 – reached Category 4 but never threatened land.
- 2005 – made landfall near Grand Isle, Louisiana, as a weak hurricane; moderate flooding and some tornado damage reported; originally reported as a tropical storm but was later upgraded to a hurricane.
- 2011 – formed northeast of Bermuda and moved out to sea.
- 2017 – first tropical cyclone to make landfall in Louisiana since 2012's Hurricane Isaac.
- 2023 – formed east of the Lesser Antilles but dissipated into an open wave without ever affecting land.

- Claire (1969) – a moderate tropical storm.
- Clara

- 1950 – a powerful typhoon that passed off the coast of Taiwan and Japan.
- 1955 – a powerful typhoon that passed off the coast of Taiwan and Japan and hit the northwestern provinces of China.
- 1959 – not areas land
- 1961 – not areas land
- 1964 – made landfall on the coast of Aurora at Dilasac Bay.
- 1967 – a Category 3 typhoon hit Taiwan and China.
- 1970 – a category 2 typhoon that only slightly affected Japan
- 1973 – not areas land
- 1975 – a Category 2 tropical cyclone that never made landfall.
- 1976 – a weak tropical storm that hit the coast of China.
- 1977 – a category 1 Atlantic hurricane that formed off the East Coast of the United States and slightly affected Bermuda.
- 1980 – a Category 2 tropical cyclone that never made landfall.
- 1981 – left flooding in the northern Philippines and southern China during September 1981.
- 1987 – not areas land

- Clare (2006)† – a Category 3 severe tropical cyclone that struck Western Australia.
- Clarence (1977) – a tropical cyclone.
- Clarissee (1981) – a tropical depression that stayed away from land.
- Claude (1965) – a severe tropical storm.
- Claudette

- 1979 (July) – caused moderate damage in Texas and the Caribbean
- 1979 (December) – caused severe damage to Mauritius and Réunion.
- 1985 – long-lived hurricane that wandered east and grazed the Azores.
- 1991 – low-end Category 4 that remained at sea for its entire lifetime.
- 1997 – lasted awhile over the open Atlantic.
- 2003 – hit Puerto Morelos, Mexico, then struck again near Port O'Connor, Texas.
- 2009 – formed south of Tallahassee, Florida, and headed northwest to the Florida Panhandle, where it made landfall on Santa Rosa Island.
- 2015 – a short-lived tropical storm that formed off the coast of North Carolina and dissipated over the open Atlantic.
- 2021 – was a weak tropical cyclone that caused heavy rain and tornadoes across the Southeastern United States in June 2021, leading to severe damage.

- Claudia

- 1962 – crossed over the western portion of the Baja California peninsula, moved over water, and again struck the peninsula before dissipating.
- 1965 – never affected land.
- 1969 – downgraded to a depression only 24 hours after first becoming a tropical storm; did not make landfall.
- 1973 – made landfall approximately 30 mi (50 km) east of Acapulco; no deaths or casualties were reported.
- 1977 – did not make a landfall.
- 1982 – a weak tropical cyclone that affected the Solomon Islands.
- 2002 –did not make a landfall.
- 2012 – did not make a landfall.
- 2020 – brought heavy rainfall to Darwin.

- Claudine (1970) – a moderate tropical storm.
- Cleo

- 1958 – a category 4 hurricane that never made landfall.
- 1960 – formed just outside the Caribbean Sea; travelled north without making landfall.
- 1964† – travelled through the Caribbean Sea and later hit Florida, Georgia, and the Carolinas before moving offshore; killed 156 people and caused approximately US$187 million in damages.
- 2009 – did not make landfall

- Clera (1982) – a tropical depression that did not significantly affect land.
- Cliff

- 1981† – struck the Gold Coast of Queensland, killing one person.
- 1992 – did not affect land.
- 2007† – affected Fiji and Tonga killing four people.
- 2022 – short-lived storm that remained out at sea.

- Clotilda (1987) – a severe tropical storm that caused 10 deaths when it affected Réunion and Mauritius.
- Clotilde (1976) – a very intense tropical cyclone that crossed Madagascar.
- Clovis (2006) – a severe tropical storm that affected Madagascar.
- Cobra (1944) – a powerful tropical cyclone that struck the United States Pacific Fleet in December 1944, during World War II, killing 790 soldiers.
- Cody (2022)† – a strong tropical cyclone in the South Pacific which caused widespread damage in Fiji.
- Colette (1966) – a severe tropical storm that crossed Madagascar.
- Colin

- 1976 – moved parallel to the Australian coast without making landfall.
- 2010 – moved across the Atlantic, fluctuating between tropical depression and tropical storm status. Dissipated before reaching Bermuda.
- 2014 – churned through the open ocean as an intense tropical cyclone; never threatened land.
- 2016 – a disorganized tropical storm that made landfall in Florida causing significant damage.
- 2022 – short-lived and weak tropical storm which formed inland over South Carolina.

- Colina (1993) – a tropical cyclone that caused 14 deaths.
- Colleen

- 1969 – a tropical cyclone.
- 1989 – threatened Guam and the Northern Mariana Islands.
- 1992 – a severe tropical storm intensified over the South China Sea before making landfall in Vietnam.
- 1995 – a tropical depression, churned in the open ocean.

- Co-may (2025)† – a strong and erratic tropical cyclone that struck the Philippine provinces of Pangasinan and Ilocos Sur, Ryukyu Islands and East China.
- Connie

- 1945 – did not make landfall
- 1955† – a Category 4 hurricane that contributed to significant flooding across the eastern United States in August 1955, just days before Hurricane Diane affected the same general area.
- 1964 – a weak tropical storm with minor impact on Mozambique and South Africa.
- 1966 (March) –
- 1966 (August) – no reported damage or deaths.
- 1970 – stalled 118 mi (190 km) from Clarion Island; did not make landfall.
- 1974 – never made landfall.
- 1987† – near Western Australia.
- 2000 – affected the islands of Mauritius and Réunion.

- Conson

- 2004 – struck Japan
- 2010 – struck the Philippines and Vietnam
- 2016 – a tropical storm that neared northeastern Japan.
- 2021† – rapidly intensified before making landfall in the Philippines and later Vietnam.

- Cook (2017)† – a severe tropical cyclone that impacted Vanuatu and New Caledonia.
- Cora

- 1953 – no reported damage or deaths.
- 1958 – formed in the Central Pacific.
- 1961 – make landfall Vietnam.
- 1964 – peaked as a Category 5 super typhoon; made landfall in the Philippines as a tropical storm.
- 1966 – a Category 5 super typhoon; struck the Ryūkyū Islands
- 1969 – struck southern Japan
- 1972 – no damage was reported, and no one was killed.
- 1975 – re-curved east of Japan.
- 1978 – after crossing Central America into the Pacific Ocean, the system reformed and became Hurricane Kristy
- 1998† – some damage to Tonga

- Corentin (2016) – a severe tropical storm that stayed away from land.
- Cornelia (1996) – a rare Mediterranean tropical-like cyclone
- Corrine (1969) – a moderate tropical storm that affected Comoros and Mozambique, causing 26 deaths.
- Coryna (1996) – a severe tropical storm that was renamed from Hubert when it crossed over from the Australian Region.
- Cosme

- 1983 – did not affect land.
- 1989 – a large Category 1 hurricane that made landfall near Acapulco; brought heavy rains, which killed at least 30 people due to drowning.
- 1995 – a Category 1 hurricane that never affected land, caused no damage or fatalities.
- 2001 – did not make landfall; dissipated about 820 mi (1,320 km) west-southwest of Cabo San Lucas, Mexico.
- 2004 – for the strongest typhoon to strike the island of Yap in the Federated States of Micronesia in about 50 years.
- 2007 – a Category 1 hurricane that stayed far from land, effects were mostly minor.
- 2008† – caused 58 deaths and $94 million (USD) in damage in Luzon, leading to its retirement and being replaced by Carina for future seasons.
- 2013 – a Category 1 hurricane; did not make landfall but caused minor damage to the west coast of Mexico and the Revillagigedo Islands.
- 2019 – never threatened land.
- 2025 – a strong tropical storm that stayed at sea.

- Costa (1986) – a severe tropical storm.
- Courtney (2025) – a Category 5 severe tropical cyclone that never affected land, caused no damage or fatalities.
- Crising

- 2001 – struck the Philippines
- 2005 – a weak tropical depression only recognized by PAGASA
- 2009 – a weak and disorganised tropical depression only recognized by PAGASA
- 2013 – struck the Philippines and Malaysia as a weak tropical storm.
- 2017 – crossed the Philippines as a tropical depression.
- 2021 – a very small storm that struck Mindanao on early May; recognized by PAGASA and the Joint Typhoon Warning Center (JTWC) as a tropical storm.
- 2025† – a Category 1 typhoon that impacted the Philippines, China, Vietnam and Thailand.

- Cristina

- 1984 – did not affect any land
- 1990 – did not make landfall
- 1996 – made landfall near Puerto Ángel; claimed 13 lives and left 62 missing; 11 fishing boats were reported missing and 350 people were left homeless
- 2002 – never threatened land; no impact reported
- 2008 – did not make landfall
- 2014 – peaked at Category 4 intensity
- 2020 – never threatened land
- 2026 – a weak, short-lived tropical storm that moved in an erratic path, affected Central America.

- Cristobal

- 2002 – a relatively weak tropical storm causing only minor damage in Bermuda, drowned 3 due to rip currents in New York however
- 2008 – formed near the South Carolina coast causing minimal damage
- 2014 – a Category 1 hurricane that affected Caribbean islands, Bermuda, and the United States East Coast
- 2020 – marked the earliest third-storm formation in the Atlantic since record-keeping began. It intensified over the Bay of Campeche before making landfall in Mexico, it then slowly turned north into the Gulf and made a second landfall in Louisiana as a moderate tropical storm.
- 2026 – a short-lived tropical storm that meandered in the subtropical Atlantic.

- Crystal (2002) – a Category 2 tropical cyclone that hit Mauritius.
- Cynthia

- 1967 – a tropical cyclone that affected Northern Territory.
- 1991 – a tropical cyclone that affected Madagascar and Tanzania.

- Cyprien (2001) – a severe tropical storm that affected Madagascar.
- Cyril

- 1984 – a weak tropical cyclone affected Fiji.
- 1996 – affected New Caledonia.
- 2012 – affected Fiji.

== See also ==
- Tropical cyclone
- Tropical cyclone naming
- European windstorm names
- Atlantic hurricane season
- List of Pacific hurricane seasons
- South Atlantic tropical cyclone
