= List of storms named Cecil =

The name Cecil has been used for six tropical cyclones in the Western North Pacific Ocean.

- Typhoon Cecil (1979) (T7903, 03W, Bebeng), struck the Philippines; was the first tropical cyclone in the Western Pacific to be given a male name.
- Typhoon Cecil (1982) (T8211, 11W, Loleng), affected Taiwan, China, Korea, and Japan.
- Typhoon Cecil (1985) (T8522, 22W, Rubing), struck the Philippines and Vietnam.
- Tropical Storm Cecil (1989) (T8904, 04W), made landfall in Vietnam.
- Tropical Storm Cecil (1990) (T9016, 18W), struck China.
- Typhoon Cecil (1993) (T9320, 25W), curved out to sea.
