= USS Schenectady =

Newport-class tank landing ship

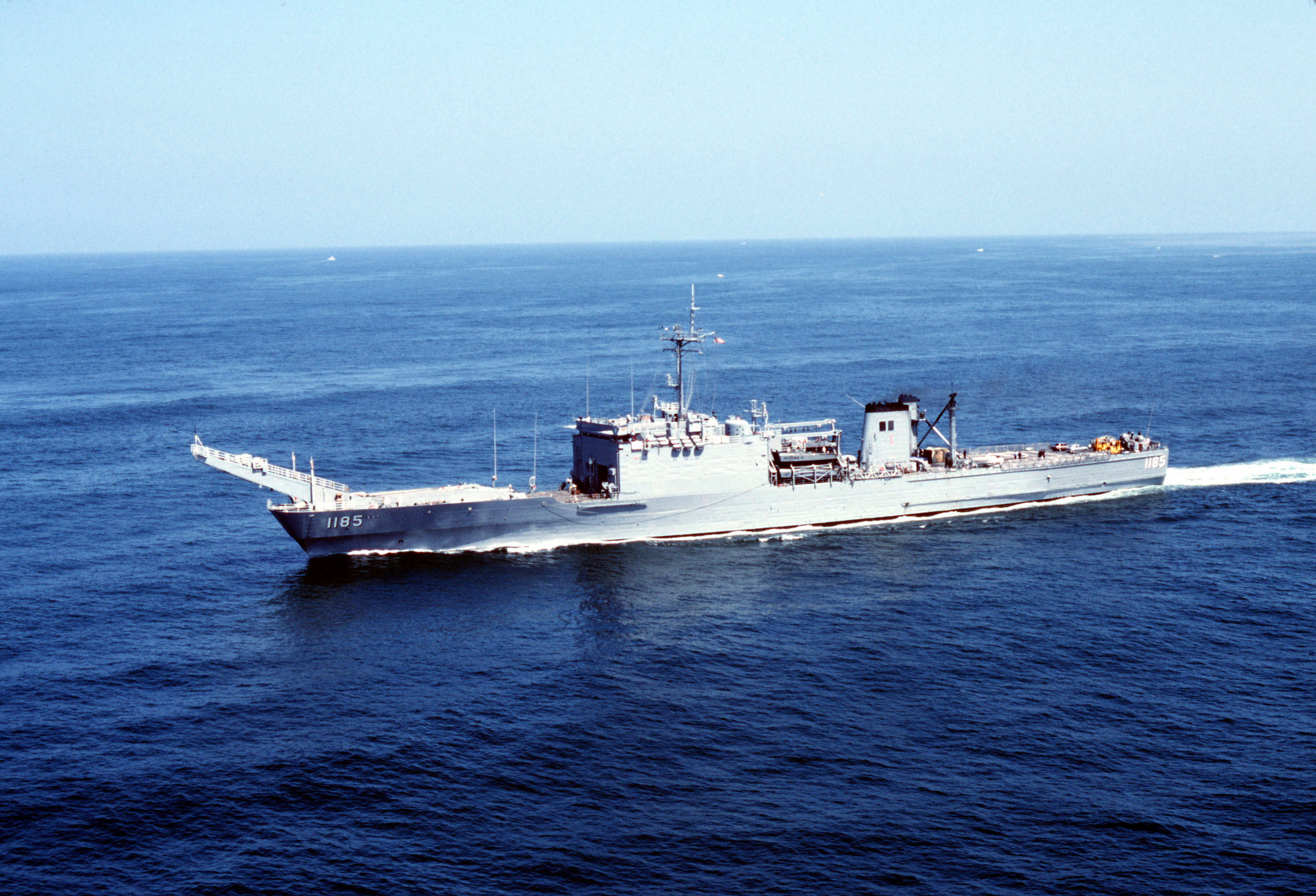
- USS Schenectady underway

History

United States
- Name: Schenectady
- Namesake: Schenectady County, New York
- Ordered: 15 July 1966
- Builder: National Steel and Shipbuilding Company, San Diego, California
- Laid down: 2 August 1968
- Launched: 24 May 1969
- Acquired: 1 May 1970
- Commissioned: 13 June 1970
- Decommissioned: 15 December 1993
- Fate: Sunk as a target, 23 November 2004
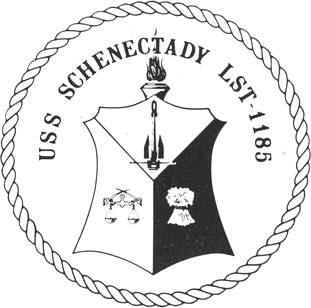
- Badge

General characteristics as built
- Class & type: Newport-class tank landing ship
- Displacement: 4,793 long tons (4,870 t) light; 8,342 long tons (8,476 t) full load
- Length: 522 ft 4 in (159.2 m) oa; 562 ft (171.3 m) over derrick arms
- Beam: 69 ft 6 in (21.2 m)
- Draft: 17 ft 6 in (5.3 m) max
- Propulsion: 2 shafts; 6 Alco diesel engines (3 per shaft); 16,500 shp (12,300 kW); Bow thruster
- Speed: 22 knots (41 km/h; 25 mph) max
- Range: 2,500 nmi (4,600 km; 2,900 mi) at 14 knots (26 km/h; 16 mph)
- Troops: 431 max
- Complement: 213
- Sensors & processing systems: 2 × Mk 63 GCFS; SPS-10 radar
- Armament: 2 × twin 3"/50 caliber guns
- Aviation facilities: Helicopter deck

USS Schenectady (LST-1185) was the fifth Newport-class tank landing ship which replaced the traditional bow door-design tank landing ships (LSTs). It was delivered to the US Navy on 1 May 1970 and commissioned on 13 June 1970. Schenectady operated in support of American forces in Vietnam and Operations Desert Shield and Desert Storm. It was decommissioned on 15 December 1993 and held in reserve until it was sunk as a target on 23 November 2004.

== Design and description ==
Schenectady was a Newport-class tank landing ship which was designed to meet the goal put forward by the United States amphibious forces to have a tank landing ship (LST) capable of over 20 knots (37 km/h; 23 mph). However, the traditional bow door form for LSTs would not be capable. Therefore, the designers of the Newport class came up with a design of a traditional ship hull with a 112-foot (34 m) aluminum ramp slung over the bow supported by two derrick arms. The 34-long-ton (35 t) ramp was capable of sustaining loads up to 75 long tons (76 t). This made the Newport class the first to depart from the standard LST design that had been developed in early World War II.

Schenectady had a displacement of 4,793 long tons (4,870 t) when light and 8,342 long tons (8,476 t) at full load. The LST was 522 feet 4 inches (159.2 m) long overall and 562 ft (171.3 m) over the derrick arms which protruded past the bow. The vessel had a beam of 69 ft 6 in (21.2 m), a draft forward of 11 ft 5 in (3.5 m) and 17 ft 5 in (5.3 m) at the stern at full load.

Schenectady was fitted with six Alco 16-645-ES diesel engines turning two shafts, three to each shaft. The system was rated at 16,500 brake horsepower (12,300 kW) and gave the ship a maximum speed of 22 knots (41 km/h; 25 mph) for short periods and could only sustain 20 knots (37 km/h; 23 mph) for an extended length of time. The LST carried 1,750 long tons (1,780 t) of diesel fuel for a range of 2,500 nautical miles (4,600 km; 2,900 mi) at the cruising speed of 14 knots (26 km/h; 16 mph). The ship was also equipped with a bow thruster to allow for better maneuvering near causeways and to hold position while offshore during the unloading of amphibious vehicles.

The Newport class were larger and faster than previous LSTs and were able to transport tanks, heavy vehicles and engineer groups and supplies that were too large for helicopters or smaller landing craft to carry. The LSTs have a ramp forward of the superstructure that connects the lower tank deck with the main deck and a passage large enough to allow access to the parking area amidships. The vessels are also equipped with a stern gate to allow the unloading of amphibious vehicles directly into the water or to unload onto a utility landing craft (LCU) or pier. At either end of the tank deck there is a 30 ft (9.1 m) turntable that permits vehicles to turn around without having to reverse. The Newport class has the capacity for 500 long tons (510 t) of vehicles, 19,000 ft^{2} (1,800 m^{2}) of cargo area and could carry up to 431 troops. The vessels also have davits for four vehicle and personnel landing craft (LCVPs) and could carry four pontoon causeway sections along the sides of the hull.

Schenectady was initially armed with four Mark 33 3-inch (76 mm)/50 caliber guns in two twin turrets. The vessel was equipped with two Mk 63 gun control fire systems (GCFS) for the 3-inch guns, but these were removed in 1977–1978. The ship also had SPS-10 surface search radar. Atop the stern gate, the vessels mounted a helicopter deck. They had a maximum complement of 213 including 11 officers.

== Construction and career ==
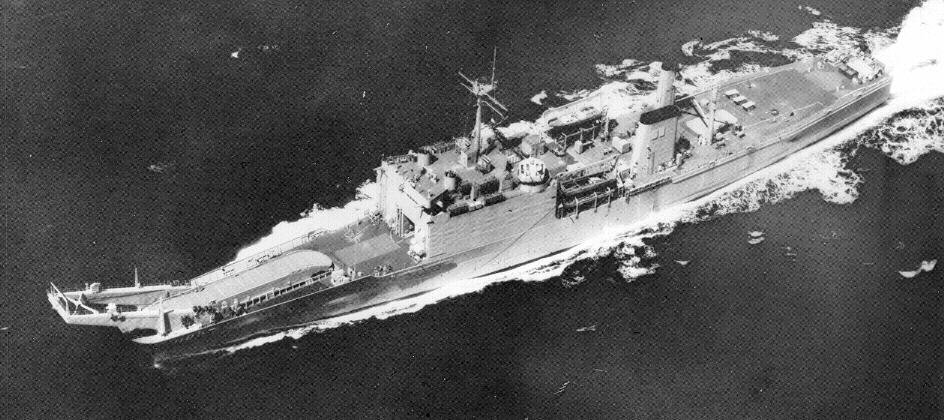
USS Schenectady underway

The LST was ordered as part of the Fiscal Year 1966 group of eight on 15 July 1966. The vessel was laid down on 2 August 1968 by the National Steel and Shipbuilding Company, in San Diego, California. Named for the county in New York, Schenectady was launched on 24 May 1969, sponsored by the wife of Senator Charles E. Goodell. The ship was commissioned on 13 June 1970 and assigned to Amphibious Squadron (PhibRon) 9 and home ported at San Diego.

Schenectady conducted training exercises and trials through the summer months of 1970. In October, the LST got underway to accompany USS Defiance and USS Surprise to Panama. The ship detached from its cohorts on 19 October and returned to San Diego on 29 October and, for the next six months, participated in further training exercises along the southern California coast. On 5 May 1971, the LST departed San Diego and headed west to participate in Operation "Keystone Oriole," an operation involving the withdrawal of marine units from Vietnam. Schenectady was diverted en route to avoid Typhoon Carla, and arrived at Danang, South Vietnam, on 24 May 1971. The LST loaded there, and departed again on 25 May. From Vietnam, it proceeded to Hong Kong, then to Subic Bay, Philippines and then on to Pearl Harbor, Hawaii.

The vessel returned to San Diego on 19 June 1971 and Schenectady remained on the west coast until 1 October 1971 when it departed San Diego with six other units comprising PhibRon 5. On 14 October, the LST joined the 7th Fleet. Four days later, it arrived at Yokosuka, Japan. From there the ship participated in training operations in the Ryukyu Island chain and moved into the Trust Territory of the Pacific Islands, conducting survey operations. The ship returned to Okinawa to load diesel electric generating plants for delivery to the government of the Philippines for use in its rural electrification program. The ship arrived at Manila on 23 November 1971 to offload its cargo.

Schenectady sailed to Subic Bay from Manila and joined Amphibious Ready Group Alpha (ARG Alpha). It departed Subic Bay with ARG Alpha on 26 November and, for the next three and a half weeks, conducted operations which ranged from the Philippines to Japan and into the South China Sea. On 20 December 1971, the LST returned to Subic Bay. Six days later, the ship proceeded to Hong Kong, where it remained through the end of the year. On 5 January 1972, Schenectady departed Hong Kong and resumed operations with the 7th Fleet. While operating with the 7th Fleet Schenectady participated in the South Vietnamese Army's offensive to recapture Quang Tri Province, in the North Central Coast region of Vietnam. On 29 June 1972, the LST came under fire during the offensive by enemy shore batteries and became the first ship of its class to return fire in an actual combat situation.

The LST returned to Coronado, California, on 6 August 1972. For the next year, Schenectady remained on the west coast, participating in exercises and otherwise engaged in normal operations. On 29 August 1973, the ship departed from the United States for another deployment to the western Pacific. It arrived in Subic Bay on 22 September 1973 and, for the next five months, transported men and cargo between ports in Japan, Taiwan, Okinawa, and the Philippines. On 10 February 1974, it stood out of Buckner Bay, Okinawa, to return to the United States via Pearl Harbor, arriving at San Diego on 6 March 1974. Schenectady earned a battle star for service along the coast of Vietnam.

In 1990, Schenectady was one of ten Newport-class ships to be deployed by the US Navy to the Middle East during the Gulf War.

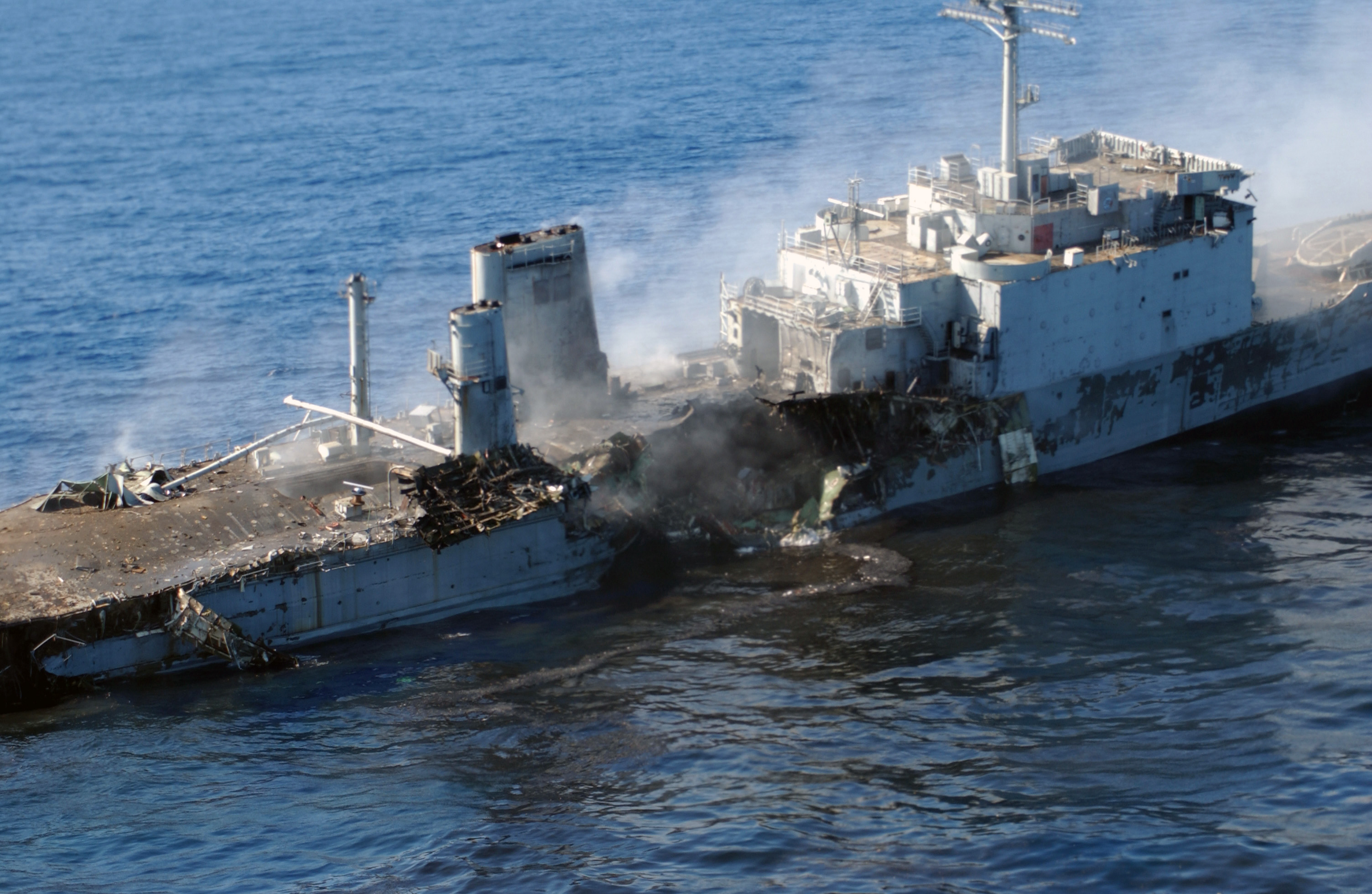
ex-USS Schenectady damaged by seven 2,000 lb (910 kg) JDAMs during USAF exercise Resultant Fury on 23 November 2004

Schenectady was decommissioned on 15 December 1993 and laid up in reserve at Naval Inactive Ship Maintenance Facility. The ship was struck from the Naval Vessel Register on 13 July 2001. Ex-Schenectady was sunk as a target on 23 November 2004 in Operation Resultant Fury, the first time a Boeing B-52 Stratofortress independently dropped guided weapons on a moving ship.
