= List of storms named Cliff =

The name Cliff has been used for four tropical cyclones worldwide, three in the South Pacific Ocean and one in the South-West Indian Ocean.

In the South Pacific:

- Cyclone Cliff (1981) – passed over New Caledonia, then, after crossing into the Australian region, made landfall in South East Queensland
- Cyclone Cliff (1992) – did not make landfall
- Cyclone Cliff (2007) – caused severe damage on Fiji

The name Cliff was retired from future use in the South Pacific basin following the 2006–07 season and was replaced with Chip.

In the South-West Indian:

- Tropical Storm Cliff (2022) – short-lived storm that remained out at sea
