= Typhoon Cecil (1985) =

Pacific typhoon in 1985

Typhoon Cecil (Rubing)
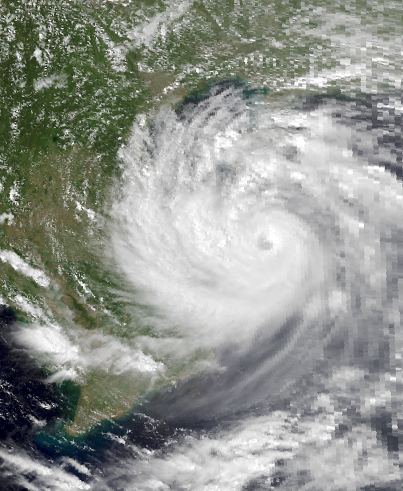
- Typhoon Cecil early on October 15

Meteorological history
- Formed: October 11, 1985
- Dissipated: October 17, 1985

Typhoon
- 10-minute sustained (JMA)
- Highest winds: 150 km/h (90 mph)
- Lowest pressure: 960 hPa (mbar); 28.35 inHg

Category 3-equivalent typhoon
- 1-minute sustained (SSHWS/JTWC)
- Highest winds: 185 km/h (115 mph)
- Lowest pressure: 944 hPa (mbar); 27.88 inHg

Overall effects
- Fatalities: 770
- Damage: $65 million (1985 USD)
- Areas affected: Philippines, Thailand, Vietnam
- Part of the 1985 Pacific typhoon season

Typhoon Cecil, known in the Philippines as Tropical Storm Rubing, was one of two typhoons to strike Vietnam within a week in 1985. Cecil originated from an area of convection that tracked west-northwest and passed south of Palau late on October 9. The disturbance became increasingly defined as it moved through the southern Philippines. On October 12, a tropical depression developed, and the next day, the depression was upgraded into a tropical storm. Cecil turned northwest over the open waters of the South China Sea as it steadily strengthened, and was classified as a typhoon on October 14. After unexpectedly slowing down, Cecil continued to intensify and at noon of October 14, reached its peak intensity of 145 km/h (90 mph). Land interaction with Vietnam triggered a weakening trend. After turning west, Cecil moved onshore just north of Huế at 22:00 UTC on October 15. After tracking into Laos, the typhoon dissipated 39 hours later.

Across Vietnam, 229,039 homes were damaged and 47,757 others were destroyed. At least 7,000 schools were damaged and 1,900 others were destroyed. Moreover, 70,000 t (77,160 short tons) of rice were wiped away. Overall, 769 people were killed, 128 were reported missing, and 200 were wounded. Approximately 3,000 ha (7,400 acres) of farmland were flooded and at least 225,000 others were left homeless. In all, damage was estimated at US$65 million. Typhoon Cecil was considered the worst natural disaster in the central portion of the country in history. Elsewhere, one person was killed in Thailand.

== Meteorological history ==
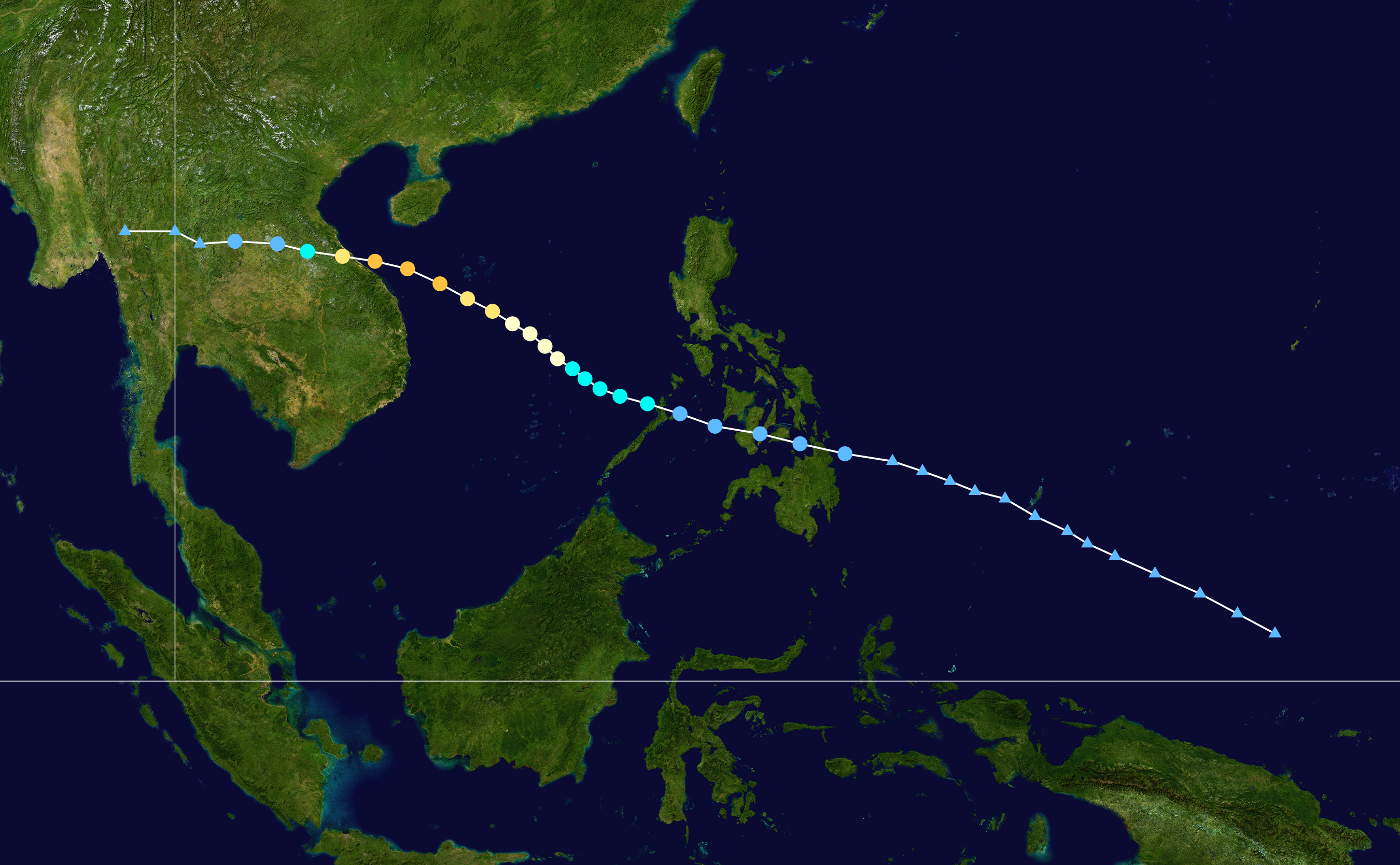
Map plotting the storm's track and intensity, according to the Saffir–Simpson scale Map key Saffir–Simpson scale Tropical depression (≤38 mph, ≤62 km/h) Tropical storm (39–73 mph, 63–118 km/h) Category 1 (74–95 mph, 119–153 km/h) Category 2 (96–110 mph, 154–177 km/h) Category 3 (111–129 mph, 178–208 km/h) Category 4 (130–156 mph, 209–251 km/h) Category 5 (≥157 mph, ≥252 km/h) Unknown Storm type Tropical cyclone Subtropical cyclone Extratropical cyclone, remnant low, tropical disturbance, or monsoon depression

Typhoon Cecil originated from an area of increasing convection on October 8. Satellite imagery showed a large area of curved convection near the equator from the 139th meridian east to the 145th meridian east. The disturbance tracked west-northwest, passing just south of Palau late on October 9. Aided by an excellent poleward outflow channel via an upper-level trough, the disturbance steadily organized. At 02:22 UTC on October 11, a Hurricane Hunter aircraft discovered a surface circulation east of Mindanao along with winds of 30 to 40 km/h (20 to 25 mph) and a barometric pressure of 1,006 mbar (29.7 inHg). On the same day, the Japan Meteorological Agency (JMA) classified the system as a tropical depression. The disturbance became more defined as it passed through the islands of the southern Philippines. (Note: The Japan Meteorological Agency is the official Regional Specialized Meteorological Center for the western Pacific Ocean.) Early on October 12, the Joint Typhoon Warning Center (JTWC) issued a Tropical Cyclone Formation Alert for the system. Later that day the JMA upgraded the depression into a tropical storm. (Note: Wind estimates from the JMA and most other basins throughout the world are sustained over 10 minutes, while estimates from the United States-based Joint Typhoon Warning Center are sustained over 1 minute. 10 minute winds are about 1.14 times the amount of 1 minute winds.) An increase in organization prompted the JTWC to classify the system as a tropical depression later that day, although post-season analysis revealed that Cecil was already a tropical storm by this time. At the time, the JTWC expected the cyclone to rapidly intensify over the South China Sea and strike Vietnam within three days.

After becoming a tropical storm, Cecil turned northwest over the open waters of the South China Sea along the southern edge of a ridge over eastern China and the East China Sea. The storm steadily intensified, with the JMA classifying the system as severe tropical storm at 00:00 UTC on October 13. After a Hurricane Hunter aircraft plane measured a pressure of 984 mbar (29.1 inHg) early on October 13, the JTWC upgraded Cecil to a typhoon at 18:00 UTC, with the JMA doing the same early the next day. Continuing to intensify, the typhoon cleared out an eye, which it would maintain until it struck land. The JMA set the peak intensity at noon on October 14, with winds of 145 km/h (90 mph) and a minimum pressure of 960 mbar (28 inHg). Meanwhile, the JTWC estimated that Cecil obtained its peak intensity of 185 km/h (115 mph) at 00:00 UTC on October 15. Continuing to slowly track northwest as the ridge to its north was weaker than expected, Cecil passed south of Hainan Island that morning and, according to the JTWC, began to weaken due to its close proximity to Vietnam. However, the JMA estimated that no changed in strength occurred during this time. Cecil turned west as the ridge to its north built back in and contrary to expectations did not make landfall until moving onshore just north of Huế at 22:00 UTC on October 15. At a weather station in Đông Hà (in present-day Quảng Trị province), the sea-level atmospheric pressure was recorded at 959.9 mbar (28.35 inHg). Cecil crossed into Laos two hours later and by 06:00 UTC on October 16, the JTWC ceased tracking the system. The JMA did the same 30 hours later.

== Impact and aftermath ==
During its formative stages, 70 fishing boats sunk or were destroyed by the storm in Iloilo in the Philippines. The first of two typhoons to strike Vietnam in a week, Cecil demolished houses, downed power lines, and caused flooding that forced large-scale evacuations in central Vietnam, where five villages were completely destroyed. In the Nghệ Tĩnh and Quảng Nam Provinces, 485 homes were destroyed and 879 were damaged. In both provinces, around 10,000 ha (24,710 acres) of rice fields were flooded and there was one fatality. Throughout the central portion of the country, 250 dispensaries and nearly 9,000 schools were destroyed. There, six hospitals and 250 medical stations were damaged and a 200-bed hospital was destroyed. Nationwide, 47,757 dwellings were destroyed, with an additional 229,039 homes were damaged. At least 7,000 schools were damaged and 1,900 others were destroyed. A total of 70,000 t (77,160 short tons) of rice were wiped away. Throughout the area, 769 people were killed and 128 were reported missing while 257 were wounded. Around 3,000 ha (7,400 acres) of farmland were flooded and at least 225,000 others were left homeless. The typhoon was considered the worst natural disaster to strike the central portion of the nation. Damage was estimated at US$65 million. Heavy rains in Thailand caused flash flooding that resulted in one causality. There, Cecil was the second typhoon to strike the nation within a week, after Typhoon Andy.

Following Cecil, the Vietnamese government requested that the World Food Programme provide 40,000 t (44,090 short tons) worth of food. To combat the damage caused by the typhoon, the United Nations Development Programme and the United Nations Office for the Coordination of Humanitarian Affairs each contributed $30,000. The European Economic Community awarded $112,676 in cash while Secours Populaire Français donated $139,188, along with 50 t (55 short tons) of iron nails, 23,200 bottles of Ampicillin, and 1,000 bags of salt. Furthermore, Trócaire contributed $162,386. Caritas Internationalis provided 800 t (880 short tons) of rice and Oxfam gave 50 t (55 short tons) and 200,000 sweaters. The government of Australia awarded 1,000 t (1,100 short tons) of rice. Canada added $50,000 while France contributed 3,500 t (3,860 short tons) of wheat. The British Red Cross provided $60,000 while the United States–based Vision International contributed $50,000 worth of clothes, medicine, and building material. Japan offered $200,000 in emergency aid.

== See also ==
- Tropical cyclones in Vietnam
- Typhoon Cecil (1982) – other tropical cyclone named Cecil, which affected Japan and South Korea
- Tropical Storm Cecil (1989) – another tropical cyclone with the same name that also severely impacted the same area 4 years after
- Typhoon Nancy (1982)
