= List of storms named Cilla =

The name Cilla has been used for two tropical cyclones in the South Pacific Ocean:

- Cyclone Cilla (1988) – did not affect any land.
- Cyclone Cilla (2003) – a weak, short-lived tropical cyclone that affected a few South Pacific islands.

== See also ==
- Cyclone Cilida (2018) – a South-West Indian Ocean tropical cyclone with a similar name.
