= List of storms named Carla =

The name Carla has been used for eight tropical cyclones worldwide: two in the Atlantic Ocean and six in the West Pacific Ocean.

In the Atlantic:

- Tropical Storm Carla (1956) – produced gale-force winds over New England
- Hurricane Carla (1961) – second most intense storm to ever strike the Texas coast; caused over $2 billion (2005 US dollars) in damages

The name Carla was retired after the 1961 season due to its significant damage in Texas. It was replaced with Carol for the 1965 season.

In the West Pacific:

- Typhoon Carla (1962) (65W) – made landfall on Hainan Island; at least 13 people were killed
- Typhoon Carla (1965) (10W, Goring)
- Typhoon Carla (1967) (29W, Trining) – hit Taiwan, showering record rainfall amounts on the island, killing 69 people
- Tropical Storm Carla (1971) (7W, Gening)
- Typhoon Carla (1974) (4W)
- Tropical Storm Carla (1977) (11W, Luming) – weak tropical storm having limited impacts on the surrounding area
