= List of storms named Chloe =

The name Chloe has been used for two tropical cyclones in the Atlantic Ocean and for two in the Australian region of the Indian Ocean.

In the Atlantic:

- Hurricane Chloe (1967) – long-lived Category 2 hurricane, churned in the open ocean
- Tropical Storm Chloe (1971) – made landfall in Belize

In the Australian region:

- Cyclone Chloe (1984) – Category 4 severe tropical cyclone (Australian scale), made landfall near Roebourne, Western Australia
- Cyclone Chloe (1995) – Category 5 severe tropical cyclone (Australian scale), made landfall in the Kimberley region of Western Australia
