= Hurricane Carol (1953) =

Category 5 Atlantic hurricane in 1953

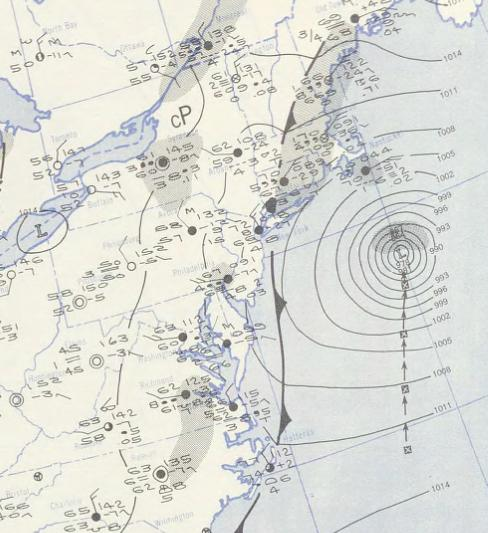
- Weather map of Hurricane Carol off the east coast of the United States on September 7

Meteorological history
- Formed: August 28, 1953
- Dissipated: September 8, 1953

Category 5 major hurricane
- 1-minute sustained (SSHWS/NWS)
- Highest winds: 160 mph (260 km/h)
- Lowest pressure: 929 mbar (hPa); 27.43 inHg

Overall effects
- Fatalities: 5
- Damage: $2 million (1953 USD)
- Areas affected: Bermuda, New England, Atlantic Canada
- IBTrACS
- Part of the 1953 Atlantic hurricane season

Hurricane Carol was the strongest storm of the 1953 Atlantic hurricane season and the first Category 5 hurricane in the Atlantic basin since the 1944 Great Atlantic Hurricane. Carol was also the first named storm to attain Category 5 status. Carol developed on August 28 off the west coast of Africa, although the Weather Bureau did not initiate advisories until five days later. On September 2, Carol attained hurricane status, based on a ship report. It moved northwestward, attaining peak winds of 160 mph (260 km/h), based on reports from the Hurricane Hunters. After weakening, it brushed Bermuda and turned northeastward near New England, passing west of Nova Scotia before making landfall near Saint John, New Brunswick on September 7. While crossing Atlantic Canada, Carol became an extratropical cyclone, which dissipated on September 9 southwest of Greenland.

When Carol initially threatened to strike Bermuda, several planes were evacuated from the island. Later, the hurricane produced high waves along the New England coastline which, in combination with foggy conditions, caused several boating accidents. At least 40 people required rescue, and four people were killed. Although winds in the region were minor, fishing damage totaled about $1 million (1953 USD, $12 million 2026 USD). In Nova Scotia, hurricane-force wind gusts downed trees and power lines, as well as heavy damage to the apple crop totaling $1 million (1950 CAD, $12.4 million 2026 USD). High waves washed several boats ashore, and also killed one person. Ferry travel was halted across Atlantic Canada, although impact was less severe outside of Nova Scotia. In Prince Edward Island, gusty winds caused isolated power outages, and minor flooding occurred in New Brunswick.

== Meteorological history ==
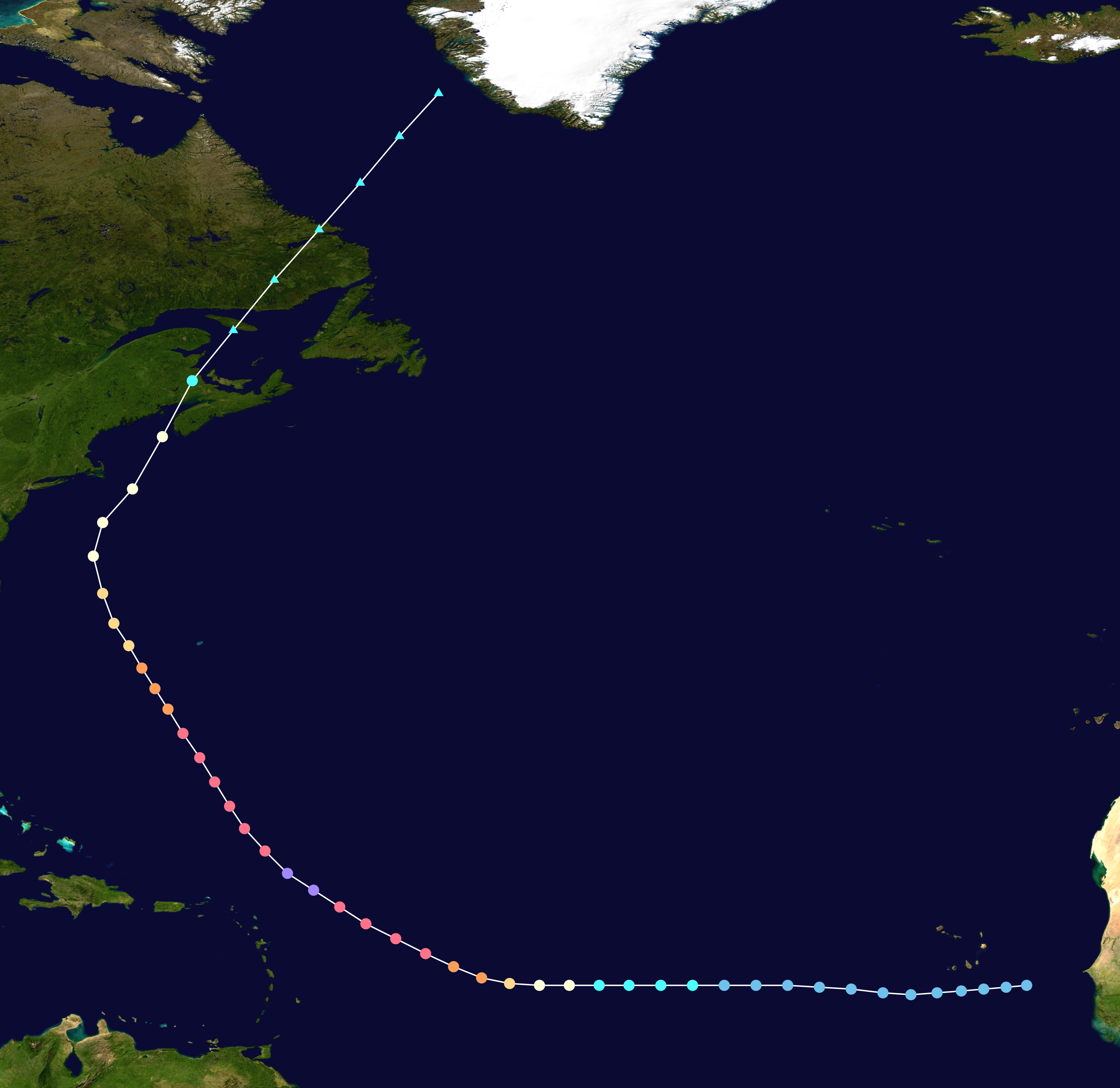
Map plotting the storm's track and intensity, according to the Saffir–Simpson scale Map key Saffir–Simpson scale Tropical depression (≤38 mph, ≤62 km/h) Tropical storm (39–73 mph, 63–118 km/h) Category 1 (74–95 mph, 119–153 km/h) Category 2 (96–110 mph, 154–177 km/h) Category 3 (111–129 mph, 178–208 km/h) Category 4 (130–156 mph, 209–251 km/h) Category 5 (≥157 mph, ≥252 km/h) Unknown Storm type Tropical cyclone Subtropical cyclone Extratropical cyclone, remnant low, tropical disturbance, or monsoon depression

In late August, a tropical wave exited the west coast of Africa, developing into a tropical depression developed near Cape Verde on August 28. It moved west-southwestward for two days before turning to the west. The depression is estimated to have intensified into a tropical storm on August 31, and subsequently it turned to the west-northwest. On September 2, the S.S. Umatilla reported winds up to force 12 on the Beaufort scale, or hurricane strength; the ship also reported very high seas and a rapidly decreasing pressure. Based on the report, the Miami Weather Bureau office initiated advisories on Hurricane Carol about 750 miles (1200 km) east-northeast of Barbados.

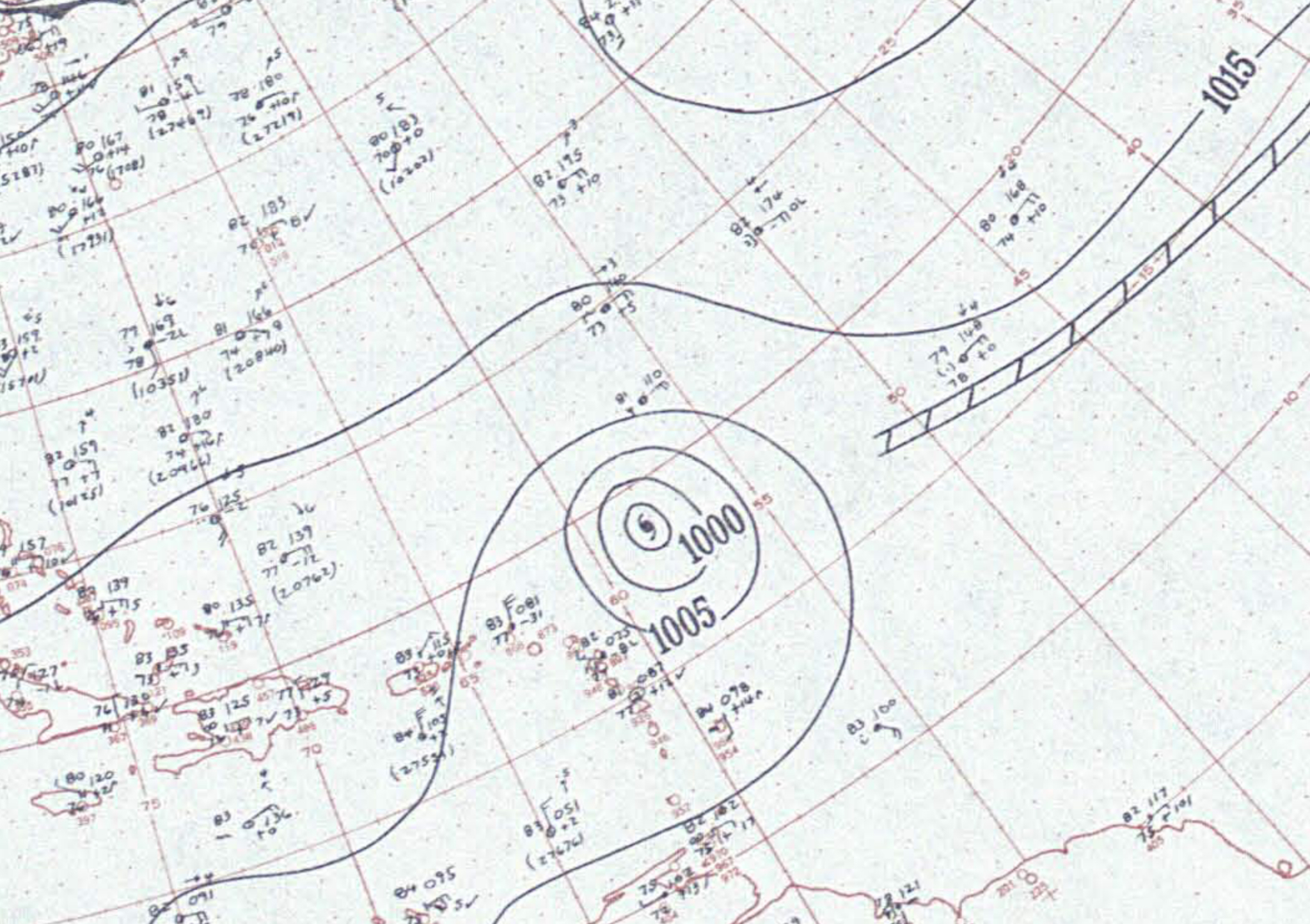
Weather map of Hurricane Carol at peak intensity on September 3

After reaching hurricane status, Carol embarked a steady intensification trend as it moved northwestward. On September 3, the Hurricane Hunters flew into the storm and reported winds of 160 mph (260 km/h), along with a minimum pressure of 929 mbar. This made Carol the strongest storm of the season. At its peak, the maximum winds were in an area 3 mi (4.8 km) in diameter across the center. The hurricane maintained peak winds for about a day before beginning to weaken. Early on September 6, Carol passed about 225 mi (362 km) southwest of Bermuda with winds of about 110 mph (180 km/h). The next day the hurricane turned to the north-northeast, bypassing Cape Cod by about 140 mi (230 km). Late on September 7, Carol brushed western Nova Scotia before making landfall near Saint John, New Brunswick with winds of around 75 mph (121 km/h). Shortly after making landfall, Carol transitioned into an extratropical cyclone, which crossed the Gulf of Saint Lawrence, eastern Quebec, and Labrador before dissipating southwest of Greenland on September 9.

== Preparations and impact ==
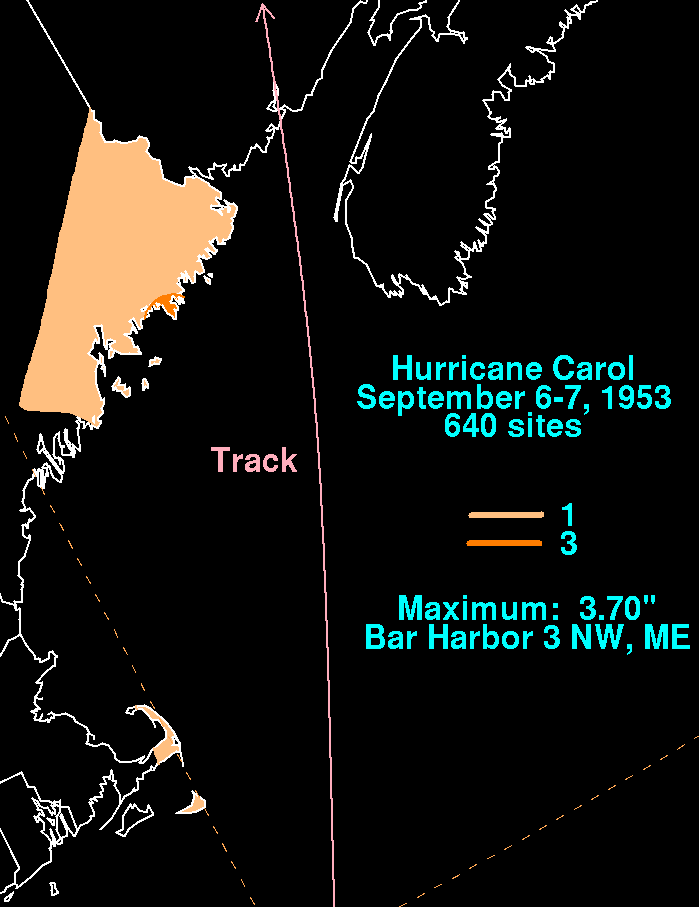
Rainfall from Carol in New England

As Carol was threatening Bermuda, planes flew away from the island and ships returned to harbor for safety. Although hurricane-force winds were initially predicted, Carol only brushed the island with high waves and gale-force winds. The winds toppled a few trees and power lines, and also injured two motorcyclists after they lost control of their vehicles.

Along the East Coast of the United States, the Weather Bureau issued storm warnings from New Jersey through Maine due to the approaching hurricane. A fishing boat capsized offshore Brooklyn, New York though all four men were rescued. The combination of high waves and foggy conditions caused several boating accidents in New England, killing four people and left at least 40 people in need of Coast Guard rescue. Winds across much of the region were not significant, reaching only 50 mph (80 km/h) on Nantucket. Across southeast Maine, Carol produced at least 1 in (25 mm) of rainfall, which was beneficial due to gardeners and trees due to previously dry conditions. Effects were generally minimal in the state, although the rainfall prompted the cancellation of a few Northeast Airlines flights. The hurricane caused moderate damage to the fishing industry in New England, totaling around $1 million (1953 USD, $12 million 2026 USD).

In the Grand Banks of Canada, the threat of the hurricane prompted fishing boats to venture back to port. In the Bay of Fundy, foggy conditions drove an ocean liner aground. Across Nova Scotia, rough seas washed a boat near Dartmouth, a schooner near Halifax, four yachts in Chester, and another three boats in Shelburne ashore. In addition, eleven yachts in Chester sank during the storm. The seas flooded a coastal road and nearby field in Prospect, destroying a garage. In Cow Bay, a man drowned after falling off of a yacht. Rough seas halted ferry service between Prince Edward Island and Nova Scotia, as well as between Prince Edward Island and New Brunswick; other ferry services across the region were delayed.

As Carol moved through eastern Canada, it dropped light to moderate rainfall along its path, peaking at 4.33 inches (110 mm) in the Côte-Nord region of eastern Quebec, along the northern coast of the Gulf of St. Lawrence. Strong winds affected much of the region, primarily Nova Scotia, including an 80 mph (129 km/h) gust in Halifax. Across the province, the combination of winds and rain downed the equivalent of about 500,000 ft^{3} (14,000 m^{3}) of trees, most of which in areas where some trees were already cut. The winds blew trees onto power lines, leaving widespread areas without telephone, telegraph, or power. In Annapolis Valley, strong winds heavily damaged the apple and grain crop, with farms experiencing losses up to 50%. Losses from the apple crop was estimated around $1 million (1950 CAD, $12.4 million 2026 USD). Strong winds left some property damage, including broken windows and at least one instance of a blown-off roof. Across the province, Carol left several people injured.

Outside of Nova Scotia, the winds from Carol were strong enough to knock down trees and power lines in New Brunswick. Light rainfall, peaking at 2.44 inches (62 mm) in the province, caused street flooding in Moncton. The rainfall reached as far west as Ontario, and as far east as Prince Edward Island, where rainfall reached 1.73 inches (44 mm). Winds in the latter province damaged roofs and downed some trees, resulting in minor power outages. Further north in Quebec, adverse conditions from the storm delayed a search party after a plane crash.

== See also ==
- Other storms of the same name
- List of Bermuda hurricanes
- Hurricane Lee (2023) – Category 5 hurricane that took a very similar track and produced similar impacts
