= List of storms named Cesar =

The name Cesar was used for three tropical cyclones in the Atlantic Ocean.

- Tropical Storm Cesar (1984), moved northeast parallel to the East Coast of the United States, losing tropical characteristics near Newfoundland
- Tropical Storm Cesar (1990), formed west of Cape Verde but dissipated while still 1000 miles (1600 km) east of Bermuda
- Hurricane Cesar (1996), formed offshore Venezuela and made landfall in Nicaragua at Category 1 strength before crossing into the Eastern Pacific where it was renamed Hurricane Douglas; killed 113 people.

The name Cesar was retired after the 1996 season, and was replaced by Cristobal in the 2002 season.
