= List of storms named Chuck =

The name Chuck has been used for two tropical cyclones in the western Pacific Ocean.

- Typhoon Chuck (1992) (T9204, 03W, Biring), made landfall on Hainan and in northern Vietnam
- Tropical Storm Chuck (1995) (T9501, 02W), remained out to sea
