= List of storms named Candice =

The name Candice has been used for one tropical cyclone in the Atlantic Ocean and one in the South-West Indian Ocean.

In the Atlantic:

- Hurricane Candice (1976) – a powerful Category 1 hurricane that passed off the coast of the United States and Atlantic Canada.

In the South-West Indian:

- Tropical Storm Candice (2024) – severe tropical storm which affected Mauritius.
