= List of storms named Carol =

The name Carol was used for nine tropical cyclones worldwide: three in the Atlantic Ocean, four in the Australian region, one in the West Pacific Ocean, and one in the South-West Indian Ocean.

In the Atlantic:

- Hurricane Carol (1953) – a Category 5 Cape Verde-type hurricane that made landfall in New Brunswick as a minimal hurricane.
- Hurricane Carol (1954) – a Category 3 hurricane that made landfall on Long Island, New York, and then in Connecticut.
- Hurricane Carol (1965) – a long-lived Category 1 hurricane that remained in the open ocean.

Due to 1954 hurricane's severity, the U.S. Weather Bureau removed the name Carol from the tropical system naming lists for 10 years. The name Carol replaced the name Carla following the 1961 season. The name Carol was permanently retired following the 1965 season due to 1954 hurricane being an active subject of research at the time. The name Carol was replaced by Camille for the 1969 season.

In the Australian region:

- Cyclone Carol (1965) – re-designated Cyclone Daisy by Météo-France after crossing into the south-west Indian basin.
- Cyclone Carol (1972) – a severe tropical cyclone that never impacted land.
- Cyclone Carol (1976) – remained in the open ocean.
- Cyclone Carol (1980) – a severe tropical cyclone that developed southwest of Timor and moved westward through the open ocean; interacted with the weaker Cyclone Dan to its north.

In the West Pacific:

- Typhoon Carol (1947) (T4703) – a Category 3 typhoon that passed near the Philippines and then Taiwan.

In the South-West Indian:

- Cyclone Carol (1960) – second highest winds recorded on Mauritius, caused 42 deaths.

== See also ==
- Hurricane Caroline (1975) – an Atlantic hurricane with a similar name.
