= List of storms named Cam =

The name Cam has been used for two tropical cyclones in the western north Pacific Ocean.

- Tropical Storm Cam (1996) (T9604, 05W, Ditang), no threat to land
- Tropical Storm Cam (1999) (T9919, 25W), minimal disruption in Hong Kong
