= List of storms named Kathy =

The name Kathy or Cathy has been used for six tropical cyclones in the Western Pacific Ocean and three in the Australian region. Following the 1983–84 season the name Kathy was retired in Australian region.

In the Western Pacific:

- Typhoon Cathy (1947) (T4718)
- Typhoon Kathy (1964) (T6414, 14W, Welpring) – the largest and longest-lived typhoon of the season
- Typhoon Kathy (1969) (T6917, 21W, Rubing) – remained at sea while paralleling the coasts of the Philippines and Japan
- Typhoon Kathy (1972) (T7222, 24W)
- Typhoon Kathy (1976) (T7601, 01W, Asiang)

In the Australian region:

- Cyclone Kathy (1970) – moved over the open ocean; was re-designated as Tropical Cyclone Michelle upon crossing into the South-West Indian Ocean basin.
- Cyclone Kathy (1984) – Category 5 severe tropical cyclone (Aus scale), devastated the Sir Edward Pellew Group of Islands
- Cyclone Cathy (1998)
