= List of storms named Cristobal =

The name Cristobal has been used for five tropical cyclones in the Atlantic Ocean. Cristobal replaced the name Cesar after the 1996 season.

- Tropical Storm Cristobal (2002), a relatively weak tropical storm causing only minor damage in Bermuda
- Tropical Storm Cristobal (2008), formed near the South Carolina coast causing minimal damage
- Hurricane Cristobal (2014), a Category 1 hurricane that affected Caribbean islands, Bermuda, and the United States East Coast
- Tropical Storm Cristobal (2020), formed over the Bay of Campeche from the remnants of Tropical Storm Amanda from the East Pacific, earliest third named storm in the Atlantic basin; made landfall in Mexico, then slowly turned north into the Gulf of Mexico and made a second landfall in Louisiana as a moderately-strong tropical storm.
- Tropical Storm Cristobal (2026), a short-lived tropical storm that meandered in the subtropical Atlantic
