= List of storms named Christine =

The name Christine has been used for three tropical cyclones: one each in the Atlantic Ocean, the Australian region and the South-West Indian Ocean.

In the Atlantic:

- Tropical Storm Christine (1973) – formed farther east than any other Atlantic tropical cyclone

In the Australian region:

- Cyclone Christine (2013) – a Category 4 severe tropical cyclone that made landfall in Western Australia

In the South-West Indian:

- Tropical Storm Christine (1964) – a severe tropical storm

== See also ==
- Cyclone Christina (2014) – a European windstorm called Christine in Ireland
