= List of storms named Cyril =

The name Cyril has been used for three tropical cyclones in the South Pacific region of the Southern Hemisphere:

- Cyclone Cyril (1984) – a weak tropical cyclone affected Fiji.
- Cyclone Cyril (1996) – affected New Caledonia.
- Cyclone Cyril (2012) – affected Fiji.
