= List of storms named Cynthia =

The name Cynthia has been used for one tropical cyclone in the South-West Indian Ocean and one tropical cyclone in the Australian Region.

- Cyclone Cynthia (1967) – a tropical cyclone that affected Northern Territory.
- Cyclone Cynthia (1991) – a tropical cyclone that affected Madagascar and Tanzania.
