= Cyclone Cilla =

Category 1 South Pacific cyclone in 2003

Tropical Cyclone Cilla
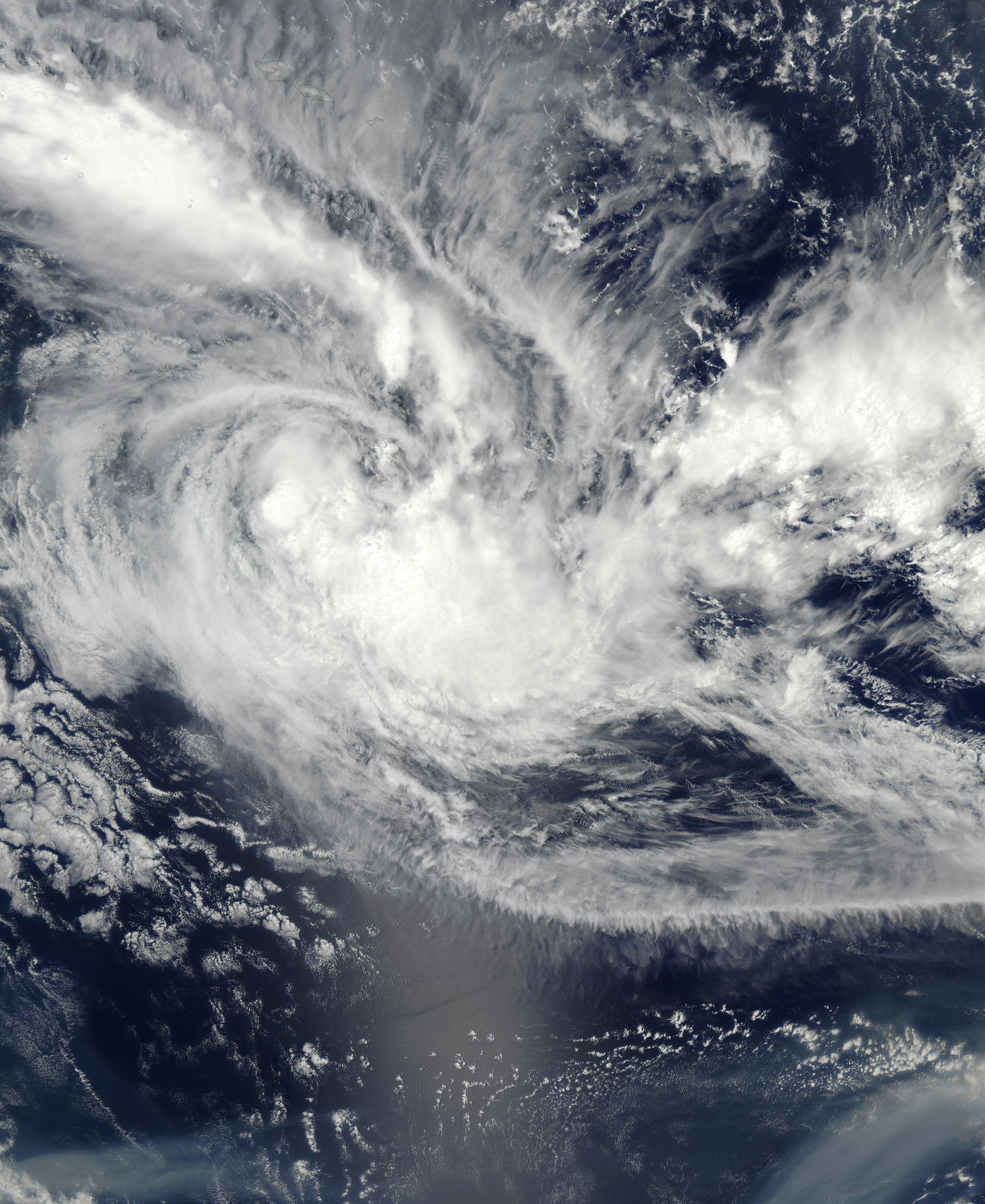
- Tropical Cyclone Cilla early on January 28, 2003

Meteorological history
- Formed: January 24, 2003
- Dissipated: January 30, 2003

Category 1 tropical cyclone
- 10-minute sustained (FMS)
- Highest winds: 75 km/h (45 mph)
- Lowest pressure: 995 hPa (mbar); 29.38 inHg

Tropical storm
- 1-minute sustained (SSHWS/JTWC)
- Highest winds: 65 km/h (40 mph)
- Lowest pressure: 997 hPa (mbar); 29.44 inHg

Overall effects
- Fatalities: None
- Damage: Minimal
- Areas affected: Fiji, Tonga, American Samoa
- IBTrACS
- Part of the 2002–03 South Pacific cyclone season

Tropical Cyclone Cilla was a tropical cyclone that brought minor damage to several islands in the South Pacific in January 2003. The fifth cyclone of the 2002–03 South Pacific cyclone season, Cyclone Cilla developed from a monsoon trough on January 26 northwest of Fiji. Initially, Cilla moved east, and due to decreased wind shear, Cilla was able to intensify. On January 28, Cilla reached its peak intensity of 75 km/h (45 mph). After slightly weakening, Cilla briefly re-intensified the next day. However, Cilla transitioned into an extratropical cyclone on January 30. Along its path, Cilla dropped heavy rainfall over islands it passed. During its formative stages, the low dropped heavy rain over Fiji, which had already been affected by Cyclone Ami two weeks prior. Damage in Tonga was mostly limited to vegetation and fruit trees; infrastructural damage was also relatively minor. Cilla also brought moderate rain to American Samoa.

== Meteorological history ==
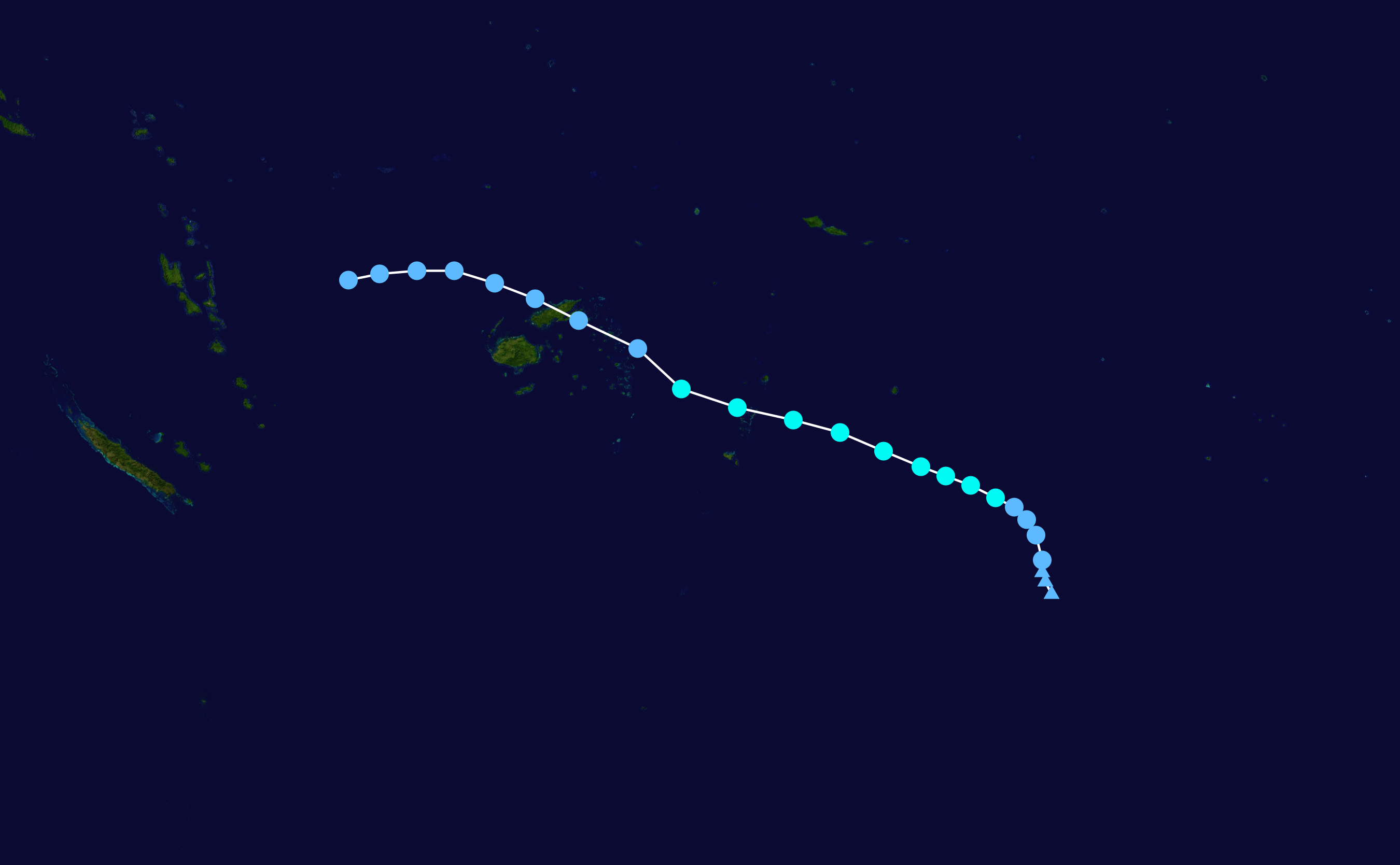
Map plotting the storm's track and intensity, according to the Saffir–Simpson scale Map key Saffir–Simpson scale Tropical depression (≤38 mph, ≤62 km/h) Tropical storm (39–73 mph, 63–118 km/h) Category 1 (74–95 mph, 119–153 km/h) Category 2 (96–110 mph, 154–177 km/h) Category 3 (111–129 mph, 178–208 km/h) Category 4 (130–156 mph, 209–251 km/h) Category 5 (≥157 mph, ≥252 km/h) Unknown Storm type Tropical cyclone Subtropical cyclone Extratropical cyclone, remnant low, tropical disturbance, or monsoon depression

On January 25, 2003, a low-pressure area formed within a monsoon trough about 300 mi (485 km) northwest of Fiji and moved to the east-southeast. That morning, the Joint Typhoon Warning Center (JTWC) began to issue warnings on the system, designating it as 12P. Shortly thereafter, Cilla turned southeast hours later in the general direction of Tonga Early on January 26, RSMC Nadi designated the low as Tropical Depression 07F, after attaining 10-minute sustained winds of 35 mph (55 km/h). At the time, the slow moving system had a poorly defined center of circulation that was hard to identify via radar and satellite imagery. In addition, most of the deep thunderstorm activity was displaced to the north and southeast of the center. Later that morning, the JTWC reported winds of 35 mph (55 km/h); however, the depression did not become any better organized throughout the day. Early the next day, RSMC Nadi upgraded the tropical depression to a Category 1 tropical cyclone on the Australian intensity scale and named it Cilla. By 0600 UTC January 27, the JTWC reported that Cilla had attained 1-minute sustained winds of 40 mph (65 km/h), which according to JTWC data, was its peak intensity. Subsequently, Cilla turned east-southeast.

Throughout the day, wind shear conditions lessened further; however, shower activity separated from the center, prompting the JTWC to issue its last warning on Tropical Cyclone Cilla later that day. At 2100 UTC January 27, RMSC Nadi remarked that the cyclone had become better organized. Upon attaining peak intensity, the storm passed fairly closed to Tonga. At 0600 UTC January 28, Cilla reached its peak intensity, with 10–minute sustained winds of 45 mph (70 km/h) per RMSC Nadi. At this time, the tropical cyclone was located about 400 mi (645 km) south-southeast of Pago Pago. Rapidly moving, Cilla showed baroclinic characteristics, hinting that the system was a hybrid low, sustaining characteristics of both tropical and nontropical cyclones. According to RMSC Nadi, Cilla weakened slightly as the storm lost organization due to increased wind shear.

On January 29, thunderstorm activity once again increased in converge around the center, though at first, the convection was sheared at times. On 0000 UTC, Dvorak satellite intensity estimates yielded a 3.0, suggesting a tropical cyclone with 10–minute winds of 45 mph (70 km/h), Cilla's secondary peak intensity. Satellite images indicated a banding pattern associated with the cyclone. The JTWC briefly watched this system for regeneration, noting it had a "fair" chance. However, continued wind shear began to weaken Cilla, and by 1200 UTC on January 29, Cilla was reduced to a tropical depression just before the system turned south-southeast. With the center exposed from the deep convection, Tropical Depression Cilla transitioned into an extratropical cyclone at 1100 UTC the next day, on January 30. The extratropical cyclone completely dissipated two days later.

== Impact and aftermath ==
As a tropical depression, Cilla passed over Vanua Levu. Even though the region had been severely affected by Cyclone Ami two weeks earlier, flood waters that resulted from rains associated with the cyclone quickly receded due to the storm's rapid motion.

When Cilla first posed a threat to Tonga, the Fiji Meteorological Service (FMS) issued a tropical cyclone alert for the entire island chain. Damage in Tonga was mostly limited to vegetation and coconut and banana trees; damage to infrastructure was minor. Peak winds of 32 mph (51 km/h) and peak gusts of 67 mph (108 km/h) were recorded in Ha'apai. Power was lost on Lifuka for about three hours during the night of January 27. Communications services were also affected but restored on January 28.

Cilla also affected the American Samoa, providing moderate rainfall over the area, peaking at 2.21 in (56 mm) in Asasfou. The name Cilla was retired by the World Meteorological Organization after the season, and was replaced by Cody.

== See also ==
- Tropical cyclones in 2003
- Weather of 2003
- Cyclone Cliff
- Cyclone Ami (2003)
- Cyclone Tam (2006)
