= Typhoon Carla (1967) =

Pacific typhoon in 1967

Typhoon Carla (Trining)
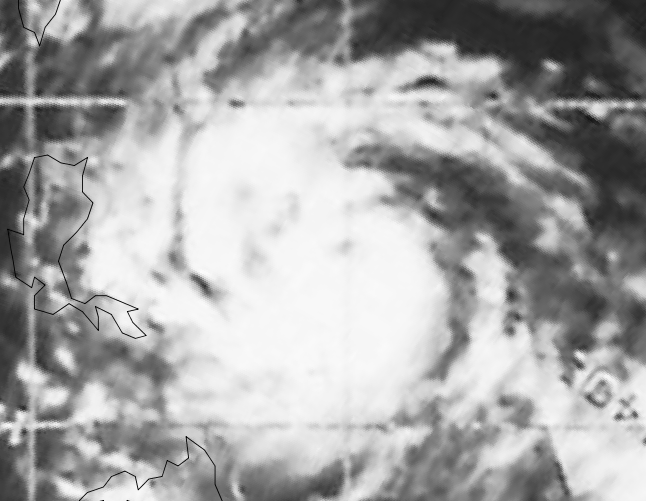
- Carla became an intense typhoon while located in the Philippine Sea on October 15.

Meteorological history
- Formed: October 10, 1967
- Dissipated: October 20, 1967

Violent typhoon
- 10-minute sustained (JMA)
- Highest winds: 205 km/h (125 mph)
- Lowest pressure: 900 hPa (mbar); 26.58 inHg

Category 5-equivalent super typhoon
- 1-minute sustained (SSHWS/JTWC)
- Highest winds: 295 km/h (185 mph)
- Lowest pressure: 900 hPa (mbar); 26.58 inHg

Overall effects
- Fatalities: 250 total
- Missing: 30
- Damage: Unknown
- Areas affected: Micronesia; Philippines; Taiwan; China; Vietnam
- Part of the 1967 Pacific typhoon season

Typhoon Carla (Philippine Name: Trining) was the strongest storm of 1967. Carla became an intense typhoon while located in the Philippine Sea on October 15. During its weakening stage, the typhoon dumped extreme rainfall around its circulation. Baguio, Philippines recorded 47.86 inches (1,216 mm) of rainfall in a 24‑hour period between October 17 and October 18; however, Carla's precipitation was significantly more extreme in Taiwan, where 108.21 inches (2,749 mm) fell in a 48‑hour period between October 17 and October 19. The worst typhoon to hit the country during the year, it killed 250 people and left 30 others missing.

== Meteorological history ==
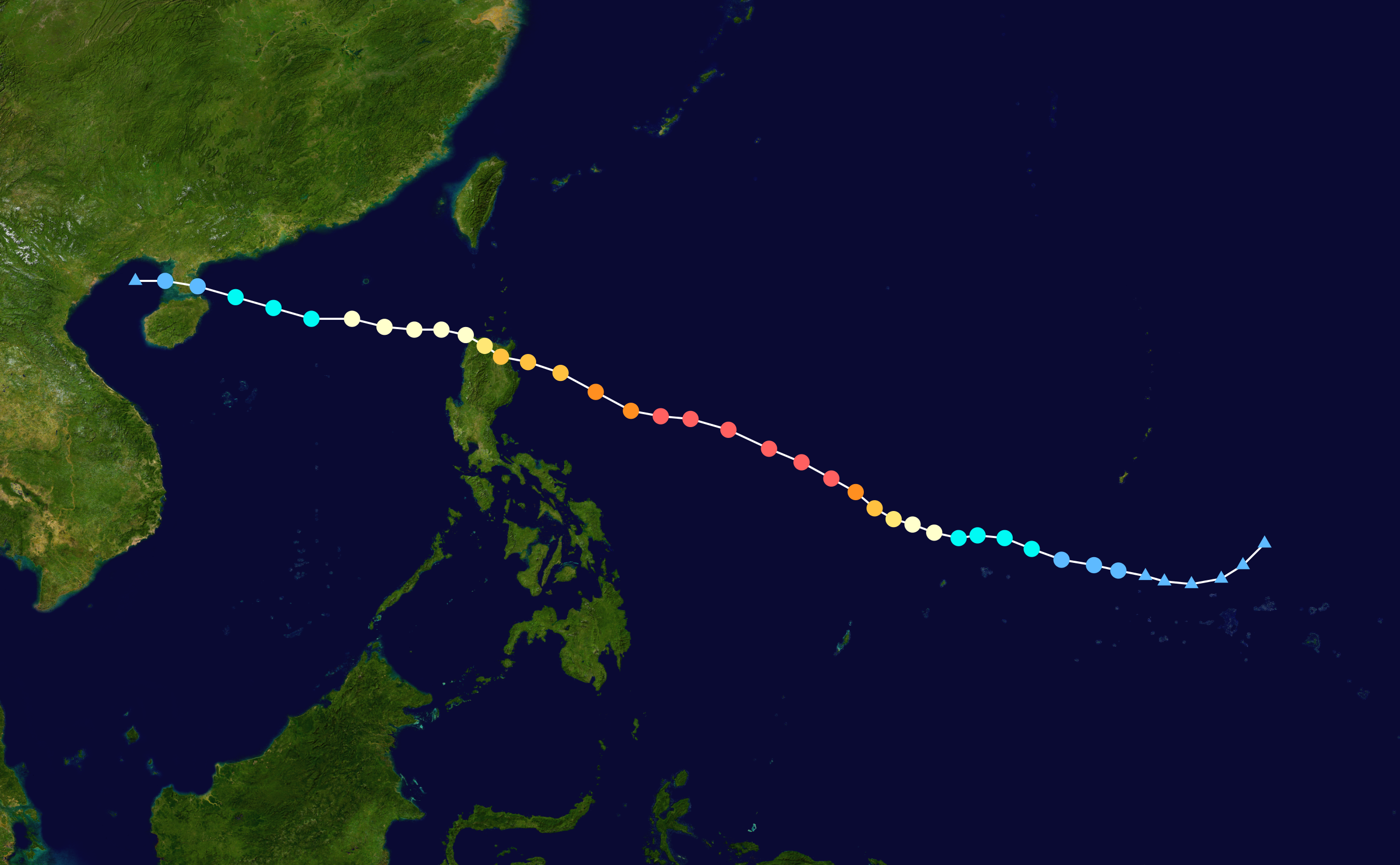
Map plotting the storm's track and intensity, according to the Saffir–Simpson scale Map key Saffir–Simpson scale Tropical depression (≤38 mph, ≤62 km/h) Tropical storm (39–73 mph, 63–118 km/h) Category 1 (74–95 mph, 119–153 km/h) Category 2 (96–110 mph, 154–177 km/h) Category 3 (111–129 mph, 178–208 km/h) Category 4 (130–156 mph, 209–251 km/h) Category 5 (≥157 mph, ≥252 km/h) Unknown Storm type Tropical cyclone Subtropical cyclone Extratropical cyclone, remnant low, tropical disturbance, or monsoon depression

The track of Typhoon Carla.

== See also ==
- 1967 Pacific typhoon season
