= List of storms named Camille =

The name Camille has been used for one tropical cyclone in the Atlantic Ocean and one in the South-West Indian Ocean.

In the Atlantic:

- Hurricane Camille (1969) – made landfall in Mississippi as a Category 5 hurricane, becoming the costliest United States hurricane at the time.

The name Camille was retired after the 1969 season.

In the South-West Indian:

- Cyclone Camille (1975) – made landfall in Madagascar as a tropical storm, weakened over land, and later strengthened into a Category 1-equivalent cyclone over open water.

== See also ==
- Typhoon Camilla (1949) – a West Pacific Ocean tropical cyclone with a similar name.
