= Typhoon Cecil (1982) =

Pacific typhoon in 1982

Typhoon Cecil (Loleng)
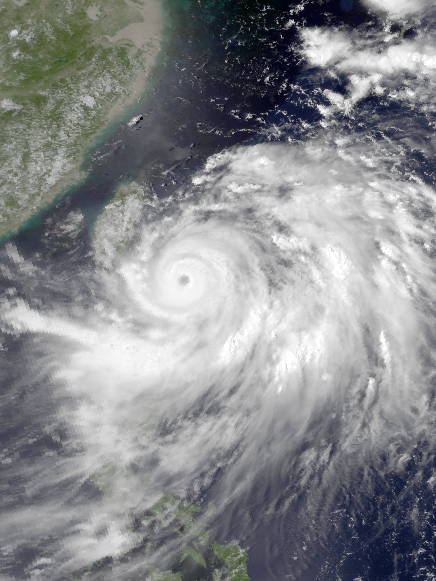
- Typhoon Cecil early on August 8

Meteorological history
- Formed: August 4, 1982
- Dissipated: August 16, 1982

Very strong typhoon
- 10-minute sustained (JMA)
- Highest winds: 155 km/h (100 mph)
- Lowest pressure: 940 hPa (mbar); 27.76 inHg

Category 4-equivalent super typhoon
- 1-minute sustained (SSHWS/JTWC)
- Highest winds: 240 km/h (150 mph)
- Lowest pressure: 914 hPa (mbar); 26.99 inHg

Overall effects
- Fatalities: 57
- Damage: $30 million (1982 USD)
- Areas affected: Japan, South Korea, Taiwan
- IBTrACS
- Part of the 1982 Pacific typhoon season

Typhoon Cecil, known in the Philippines as Super Typhoon Loleng, was a mid-season tropical cyclone that affected Japan and South Korea during August 1982. An area of disturbed weather formed to the north of Truk on July 31 and tracked westward over the next several days. Following an increase in shower activity and a decrease in wind shear, a tropical depression developed on August 4. Two days later, the depression strengthened into a tropical storm. After turning northwestward and then northward, Cecil intensified into a typhoon on August 7, and then began to deepen at a rapid clip. On August 8, Cecil attained its maximum intensity as it brushed Taiwan. There, 19 people were killed, including 4 in Wugu District, where 2,800 families sought shelter. After pulling away from Taiwan, Typhoon Cecil moved northwestward, and then on August 10, turned to the north-northeast. Colder air, cooler waters, and higher shear contributed to a weakening trend, and Cecil was downgraded to a tropical storm on August 11. Although Cecil passed east of Japan, it came close enough to the country to drop heavy rains. Nation-wide, three people were killed and two were injured. A total of 2,100 households lost power in Hinokage. On August 14, Cecil turned east and struck South Korea as a minimal tropical storm before dissipating over the Sea of Japan. Throughout South Korea, 35 people were killed, 28 went missing, and 28 others sustained injuries. Almost 1,300 houses were flooded, which resulted in 6,200 people becoming homeless. Damage was estimated at US$30 million. (Note: All damage totals are in 1982 values of their respective currencies.)

== Meteorological history ==
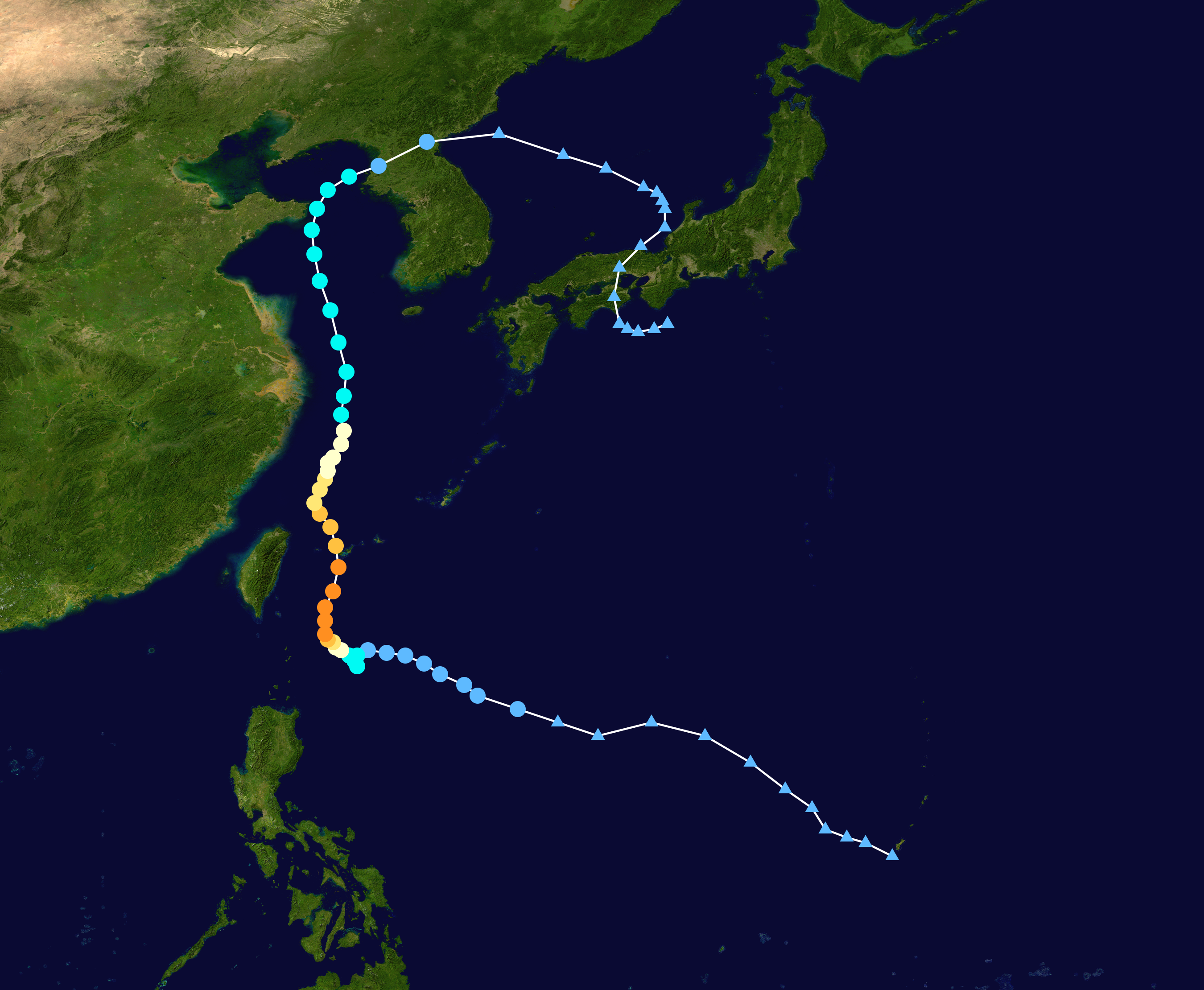
Map plotting the storm's track and intensity, according to the Saffir–Simpson scale Map key Saffir–Simpson scale Tropical depression (≤38 mph, ≤62 km/h) Tropical storm (39–73 mph, 63–118 km/h) Category 1 (74–95 mph, 119–153 km/h) Category 2 (96–110 mph, 154–177 km/h) Category 3 (111–129 mph, 178–208 km/h) Category 4 (130–156 mph, 209–251 km/h) Category 5 (≥157 mph, ≥252 km/h) Unknown Storm type Tropical cyclone Subtropical cyclone Extratropical cyclone, remnant low, tropical disturbance, or monsoon depression

The tropical disturbance that would later become Typhoon Cecil was first distinguishable as a low-level circulation about 465 km (290 mi) north of Truk on July 31. Over the next four days, the disturbance tracked westward and remained embedded in the monsoon trough, maintaining a closed surface circulation and an area of enhanced convective activity on satellite imagery. Initially, a Tropical Cyclone Formation Alert (TCFA) was not issued because strong easterly wind shear was expected to inhibit development. On August 4, following an increase in convective activity, a decrease in wind shear, and ship reports in the area measuring central pressures of 1,000–1,003 mbar (29.5–29.6 inHg), the Joint Typhoon Warning Center (JTWC) issued a TCFA. Meanwhile, the Japan Meteorological Agency (JMA) upgraded the system into a tropical depression. (Note: The Japan Meteorological Agency is the official Regional Specialized Meteorological Center for the western Pacific Ocean.) The JTWC upgraded the system into a tropical depression at 06:00 UTC on August 5 after a Hurricane Hunter aircraft mission observed sustained winds of 50 km/h (30 mph).

The depression continued to track westward under the influence of easterly steering currents along the southern periphery of a subtropical ridge. On August 6, both the JTWC and the JMA classified the depression as Tropical Storm Cecil. (Note: Wind estimates from the JMA and most other basins throughout the world are sustained over 10 minutes, while estimates from the United States-based Joint Typhoon Warning Center are sustained over 1 minute. 10 minute winds are about 1.14 times the amount of 1 minute winds.) Cecil briefly turned southward, slowed down, and then curved northwestward. At 00:00 UTC on August 7, the JTWC upgraded Cecil into a typhoon, with the JMA following suit several hours later. Over the ensuing 24 hours, Cecil entered a period of rapid deepening, and by 00:00 UTC on August 8, the JTWC had raised the intensity to 185 km/h (115 mph). Midday on August 8, the JMA reported that Cecil attained its peak intensity of 200 km/h (125 mph) and a minimum barometric pressure of 920 mbar (27 inHg). The JTWC estimated that Cecil attained a peak intensity of 235 km/h (145 mph) at 18:00 UTC while located 220 km (135 mi) east of Taiwan.

As Cecil approached Taiwan from the southeast, it turned sharply northward until reaching the 25th parallel north when Cecil once again assumed a more northwestward track. On August 10, Cecil turned toward the north-northeast and the combined effects of colder ocean temperatures, vertical wind shear, and colder air aloft began to take their toll. On August 11, the JTWC downgraded Cecil to a tropical storm as it tracked northward under the influence of a subtropical ridge. That same day, the JMA briefly downgraded Cecil to a severe tropical storm, although data from the agency suggested that Cecil reached a secondary peak intensity of 130 km/h (80 mph) that evening. At 00:00 UTC on August 12, the JMA downgraded Cecil back to a severe tropical storm for the final time. The next day, Cecil was downgraded to a tropical storm by the JMA. By August 14, Cecil had passed to the east of Japan was beyond the northward influence of the subtropical ridge and began to track eastward, striking South Korea as a minimal tropical storm. Cecil's circulation was unable to reorganize after crossing the Korean peninsula and dissipated in the Sea of Japan on August 15, with the JMA ceasing to track the system at 06:00 UTC.

== Impact ==
Although Cecil never approached closer than 150 km (95 mi) to Taiwan, the outer rainbands of the typhoon lashed Taiwan with heavy rains, where 230 mm (9.2 in) fell in the capital of Taipei during a 32-hour time span. A landslide killed 18 people in the Wugu District, where 4 people were rendered missing and 2,800 families were stranded. Flash flooding claimed one life and resulted in four others missing in Taoyuan. Overall, 19 people perished in the country. After passing Taiwan, rough seas caused by the storm near the Ryukyu Islands left the 24,655 t (27,177 short tons) World Cosmos and 3,654 t (4,028 short tons) Marvie ships in distress. The storm dropped heavy rainfall across much of Japan. A peak rainfall total of 500 mm (20 in) occurred at Nakagoya Station, including a record 472 mm (18.6 in) in 24 hours. Within an hour, 70 mm (2.8 in) fell in Nishimera. Moreover, a wind gust of 152 km/h (94 mph) was recorded in Tshigaki. Nation-wide, three people were killed and two others were wounded in Miyazaki Prefecture and Oita Prefecture. In Hinokage, 2,100 homes lost electricity and 500 residents were evacuated from their homes.

Because Cecil, at the time of landfall, was only a minimal tropical storm, the primary threat associated with the storm across South Korea was heavy rainfall. The storm dumped 410 mm (16 in) of rain in some places, including 550 mm (22 in) in Sancheong County. These rains resulted in landslides in 10 provinces. Nationwide, 35 people were killed, 28 were missing, and 28 were hurt. Nearly 1,300 houses were flooded, leaving 6,200 people homeless. Sancheong County along with the city of Changwon were the hardest hit by the storm, where three mudslides killed nine people and left six missing. In all, damage in the country amounted to US$30 million.

== See also ==
- Tropical Storm Gladys (1991) – similar track and time of year
