= Tropical Storm Cecil =

Pacific severe tropical storm in 1989

Severe Tropical Storm Cecil
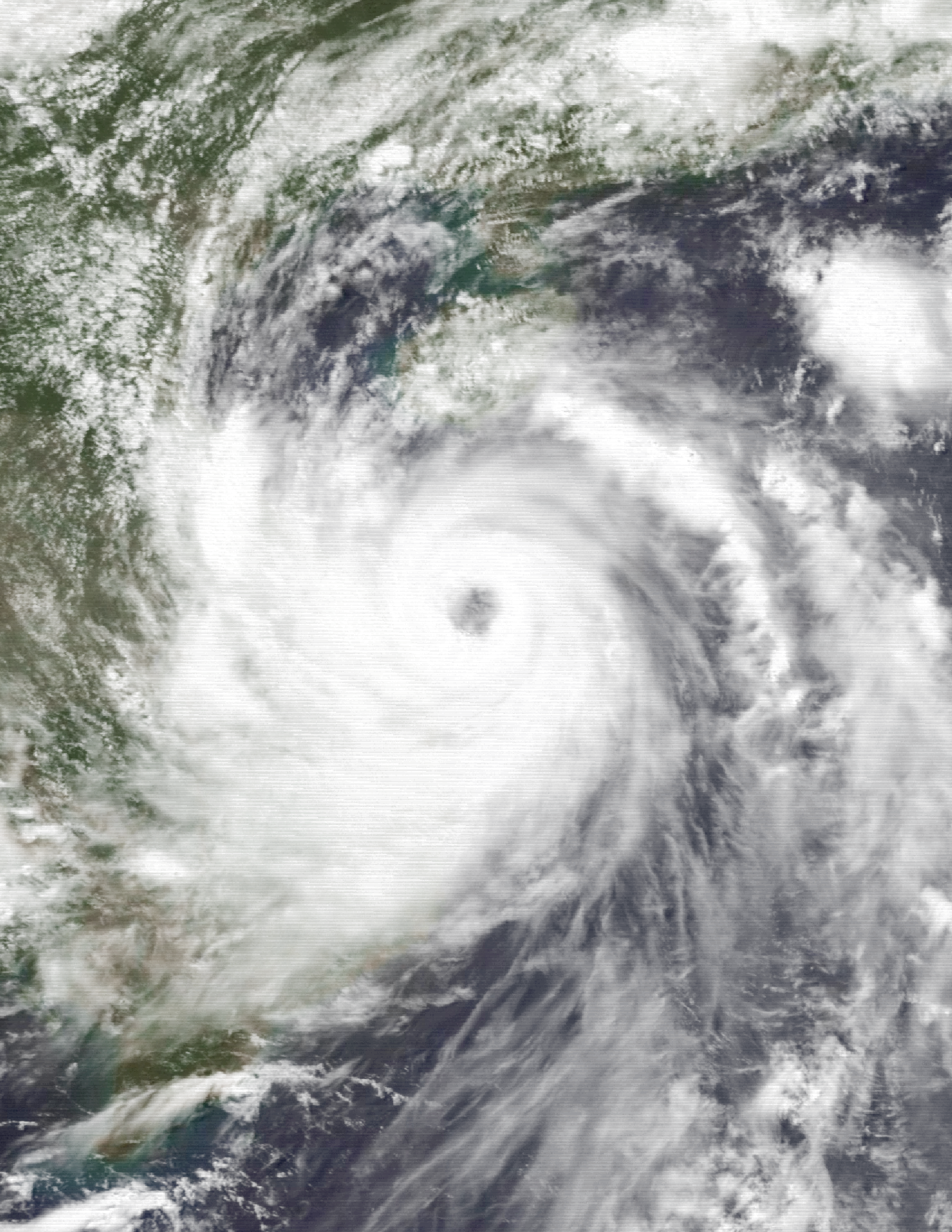
- Tropical Storm Cecil approaching central Vietnam on May 24

Meteorological history
- Formed: May 22, 1989
- Dissipated: May 26, 1989

Severe tropical storm
- 10-minute sustained (JMA)
- Highest winds: 110 km/h (70 mph)
- Lowest pressure: 975 hPa (mbar); 28.79 inHg

Category 1-equivalent tropical cyclone
- 1-minute sustained (SSHWS/JTWC)
- Highest winds: 140 km/h (85 mph)
- Lowest pressure: 967 hPa (mbar); 28.56 inHg

Overall effects
- Fatalities: 751 total
- Damage: $71.7 million (1989 USD)
- Areas affected: Vietnam, Laos, Thailand
- IBTrACS
- Part of the 1989 Pacific typhoon season

Severe Tropical Storm Cecil was a deadly and destructive typhoon that caused devastating floods in central Vietnam which killed 751 people in May of 1989. The storm developed as a tropical depression over the South China Sea on May 22. Tracking north-northwestward, the system steadily intensified, attaining peak winds of 110 km/h (68 mph). The Joint Typhoon Warning Center (JTWC) assessed Cecil to have been slightly stronger with one-minute sustained winds of 140 km/h (87 mph). (Note: The Joint Typhoon Warning Center is a joint United States Navy – United States Air Force task force that issues tropical cyclone warnings for the western Pacific Ocean and other regions.) The storm made landfall near Hội An, Vietnam early on May 25 and quickly weakened. The system later dissipated over Laos on May 26.

In Vietnam, heavy rains accompanied the storm, amounting to over 510 mm (20 in) in some areas, triggered catastrophic and deadly flooding. Widespread structural and agricultural losses took place in addition to the significant loss of life, with damage estimated at ₫300 billion ($71.7 million). In the wake of the flooding, some international aid was sent to Vietnam, though most relief work was conducted by the nation's government, local agencies, and the Red Cross.

== Meteorological history ==
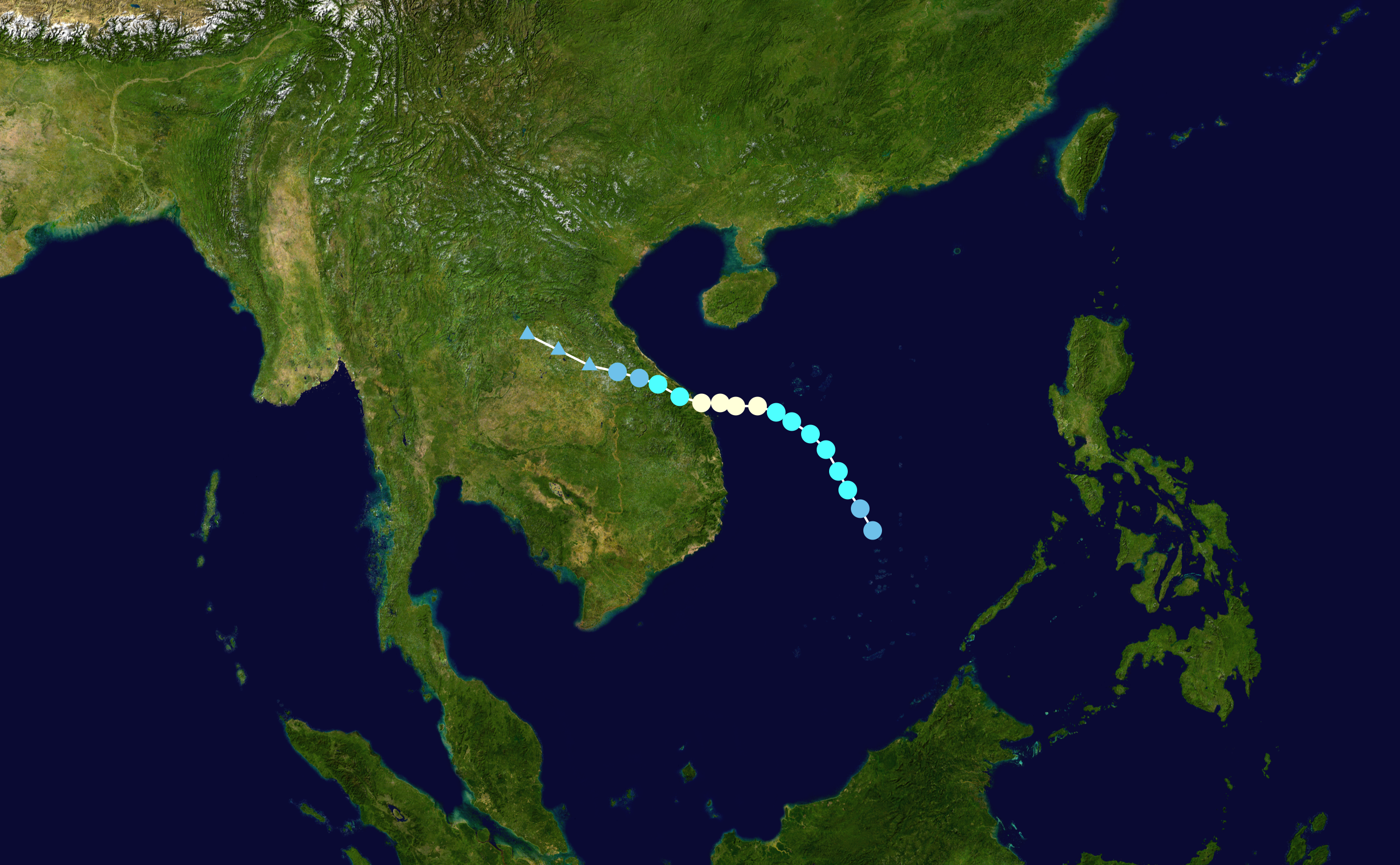
Map plotting the storm's track and intensity, according to the Saffir–Simpson scale Map key Saffir–Simpson scale Tropical depression (≤38 mph, ≤62 km/h) Tropical storm (39–73 mph, 63–118 km/h) Category 1 (74–95 mph, 119–153 km/h) Category 2 (96–110 mph, 154–177 km/h) Category 3 (111–129 mph, 178–208 km/h) Category 4 (130–156 mph, 209–251 km/h) Category 5 (≥157 mph, ≥252 km/h) Unknown Storm type Tropical cyclone Subtropical cyclone Extratropical cyclone, remnant low, tropical disturbance, or monsoon depression

On May 20, following Typhoon Brenda's passage through the South China Sea, a monsoon trough extending from the area into the Bay of Bengal received enhanced low-level southwesterly flow. An environment of weak wind shear in the wake of the typhoon allowed a new area of low pressure to form within the southwesterly flow on May 21. With convection becoming persistent and the system's overall presentation more organized by May 22, the JTWC issued a Tropical Cyclone Formation Alert at 0300 UTC. Around this time, the Japan Meteorological Agency (JMA) classified the system as a tropical depression. (Note: The Japan Meteorological Agency is the official Regional Specialized Meteorological Center for the western Pacific Ocean.) Later that day, convection wrapped entirely around the center of circulation; this structural improvement, combined with nearby surface observations, prompted the JTWC to designate the system as Tropical Storm Cecil.

Initially, Cecil was forecast to maintain a northward track into a weakness in a subtropical ridge left behind by Typhoon Brenda; however, Cecil turned westward on May 23 due to another ridge over China. With favorable atmospheric conditions, Cecil continued to intensify through May 24. By 0600 UTC, a ragged 75 km (47 mi) wide eye developed over the center of circulation, indicating it had become a typhoon. The storm ultimately attained peak winds of 140 km/h (87 mph) while situated just off the coast of central Vietnam. However, the JMA reported Cecil to have been slightly weaker, classifying it as a severe tropical storm with ten-minute sustained winds of 110 km/h (68 mph). Around 1800 UTC (just after midnight on May 25, local time), the storm made landfall near Hoi An with winds of 130 km/h (81 mph). Once onshore, Cecil quickly weakened to a tropical depression. Turning slightly to the west-northwest, the remnants of Cecil continued inland before dissipating over eastern Laos early on May 26.

== Impact and aftermath ==
In addition to the considerable losses that took place in Vietnam, Cecil also produced heavy rains in Laos and northeastern Thailand, resulting in flooding and crop damage.

=== Vietnam ===
Tropical Storm Cecil was regarded as the worst storm to strike Vietnam in 50 years. In some areas, rainfall exceeded 510 mm (20 in). Approximately 105,600 hectares of rice and other crops were destroyed and another 78,300 hectares were otherwise inundated. About 7,500 metric tons of rice seeds were also lost. The hardest hit areas were in Quảng Nam Province, where damage reached ₫300 billion ($71.7 million). The storm destroyed at least 10,000 homes and damaged another 27,000, leaving an estimated 336,000 people homeless. Approximately 60 percent of the forests and forestry nurseries in the province were ruined. By June 5, 151 people were confirmed dead across the country with another 600 missing. Eventually, the death toll was revised to 751 as all missing persons were considered dead.

In the wake of the storm, Vietnamese soldiers were deployed to rescue survivors. Local police forces were also stepped up to prevent looting. On June 5 government also requested international assistance to deal with the scale of the disaster. However, this was later retracted on June 16, though spontaneous donations were appreciated. The governments of Australia and France provided Vietnam with $75,188 and $73,964 in funds respectively. Additionally, the Swedish Red Cross donated clothing, which was later distributed by the local Red Cross along with medicine and relief supplies. A total of ₫52 million ($124,000) worth of funds and relief supplies, including 1,600 m (5,200 ft) of fabric, and two tons of clothing, was sent to Quảng Nam province.

== See also ==
- 1989 Pacific typhoon season
- Other tropical cyclones that impacted Vietnam in 1989:

- Typhoon Angela (1989)
- Typhoon Dan (1989)
- Typhoon Elsie (1989)
