= Cyclone Cliff =

Category 2 South Pacific cyclone in 2007

Tropical Cyclone Cliff
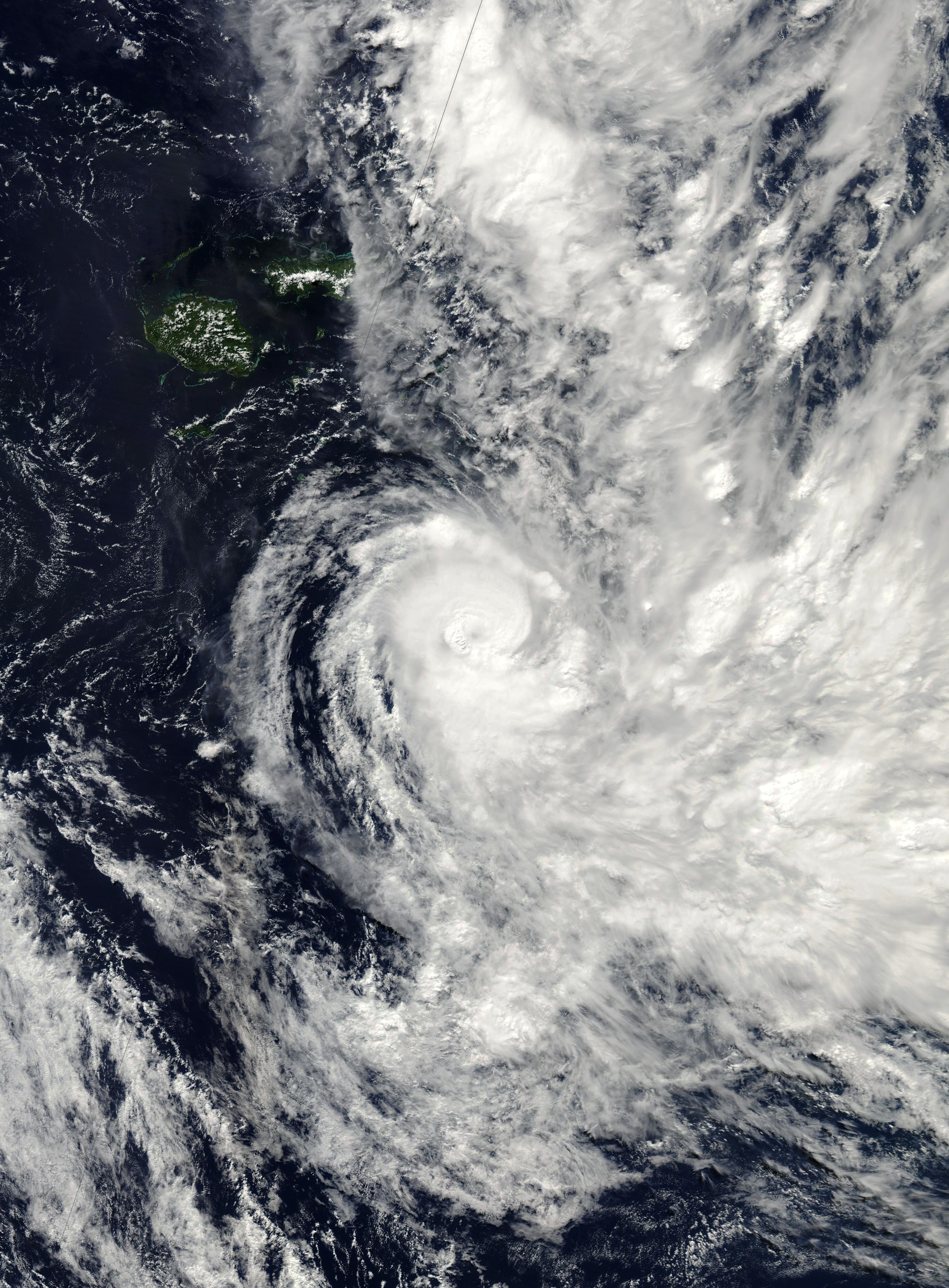
- Tropical Cyclone Cliff at peak

Meteorological history
- Formed: April 1, 2007
- Dissipated: April 6, 2007

Category 2 tropical cyclone
- 10-minute sustained (FMS)
- Highest winds: 100 km/h (65 mph)
- Lowest pressure: 980 hPa (mbar); 28.94 inHg

Tropical storm
- 1-minute sustained (SSHWS/JTWC)
- Highest winds: 100 km/h (65 mph)
- Lowest pressure: 982 hPa (mbar); 29.00 inHg

Overall effects
- Fatalities: 1 direct, 3 indirect
- Damage: $4 million (2007 USD)
- Areas affected: Fiji and Tonga
- IBTrACS
- Part of the 2006–07 South Pacific cyclone season

Tropical Cyclone Cliff was first noted as a weak tropical disturbance on April 1, 2007, within a trough of low pressure about 210 km (130 mi) to the southwest of Rotuma. Over the next couple of days the system drifted towards the southeast and Fiji, in an area of strong wind shear. During April 3, the system slightly accelerated, as it moved towards the south-southeast before the westerly wind shear around the system relaxed sufficiently to allow the depression to consolidate while it was located near Vanua Levu.

Early on April 4, the depression moved around the northeastern tip of Vanua Levu as bands of atmospheric convection rapidly developed and wrapped into the low level circulation center. At 0300 UTC while the system was located about 95 km (60 mi) to the south-southeast of Labasa, RSMC Nadi named the depression, Cliff after the system had developed into a category 1 tropical cyclone on the Australian tropical cyclone intensity scale. This was despite gale force winds not being present near the systems center, as required by the tropical cyclone operational plan for the region. After Cliff had been named gale-force winds rapidly developed near the center, as it continued to intensify and accelerate towards the south-southeast through the Lau group of islands. At around 0900 UTC on April 4, the United States Joint Typhoon Warning Center (JTWC) initiated advisories on the system and designated it as Tropical Cyclone 23P as it became a tropical storm. Over the next 24 hours Cliff continued to intensify, before the JTWC and RSMC Nadi reported during the next day, that Cliff had reached its peak intensity with sustained wind-speeds of 100 km/h (65 mph). After peaking in intensity, the system subsequently accelerated further towards the southeast and into an area of cooler seas and higher wind shear. This subsequently caused Cliff to become an extratropical cyclone during February 6, before the system was last noted later that day as it merged with a mid-latitude frontal boundary.

Cyclone Cliff was responsible for one death. In the wake of the storm, an outbreak of typhoid and leptospirosis infected 99 people and killed three across Fiji.

== Meteorological history ==
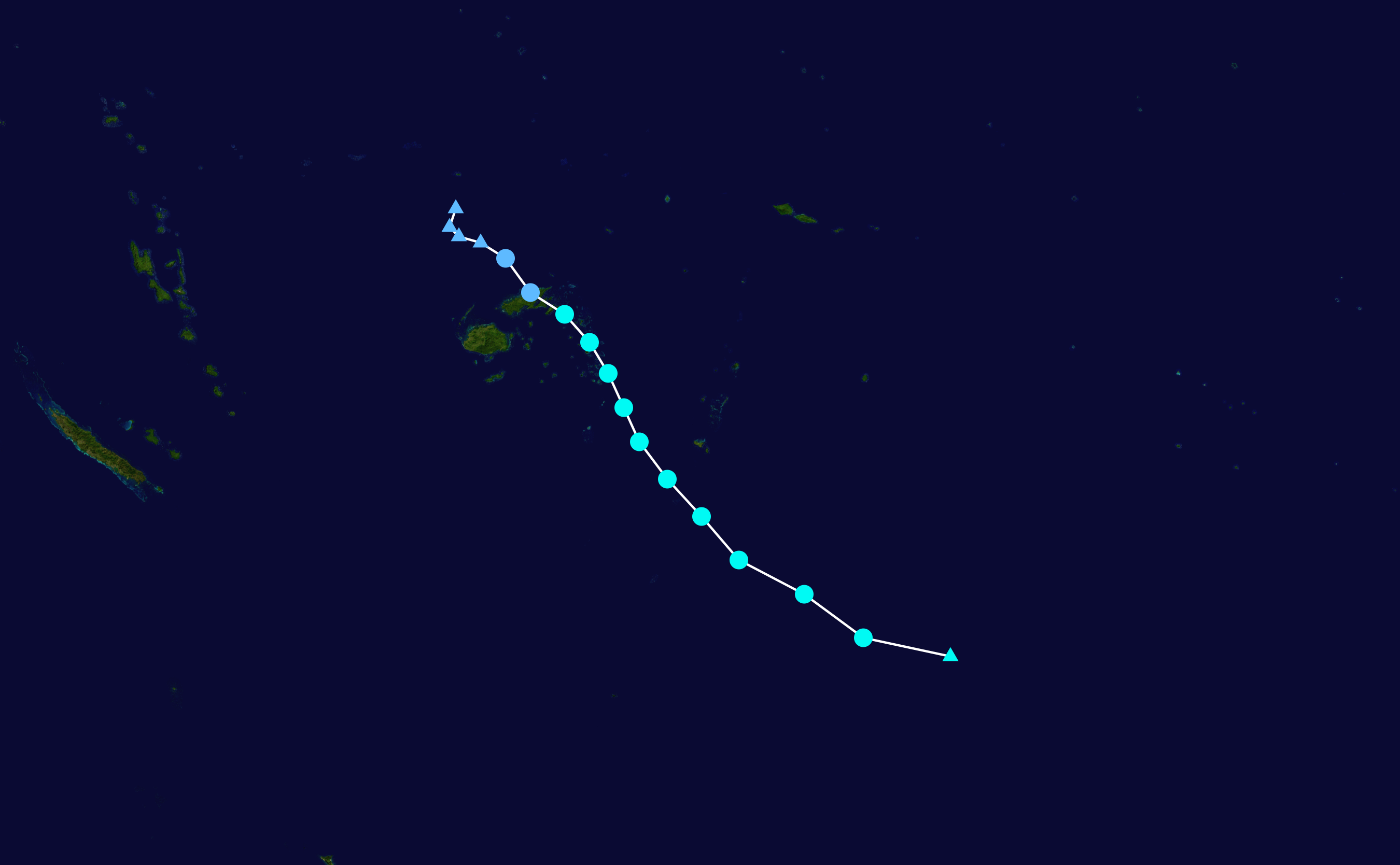
Map plotting the storm's track and intensity, according to the Saffir–Simpson scale Map key Saffir–Simpson scale Tropical depression (≤38 mph, ≤62 km/h) Tropical storm (39–73 mph, 63–118 km/h) Category 1 (74–95 mph, 119–153 km/h) Category 2 (96–110 mph, 154–177 km/h) Category 3 (111–129 mph, 178–208 km/h) Category 4 (130–156 mph, 209–251 km/h) Category 5 (≥157 mph, ≥252 km/h) Unknown Storm type Tropical cyclone Subtropical cyclone Extratropical cyclone, remnant low, tropical disturbance, or monsoon depression

On April 1, 2007, the Fiji Meteorological Service's Regional Specialized Meteorological Center in Nadi, Fiji (RSMC Nadi) reported that a weak tropical disturbance had developed, along a slow moving trough of low pressure about 210 km (130 mi) to the southwest of Rotuma. Over the next couple of days the system drifted towards the southeast and Fiji, in an area of strong westerly wind shear to the south of a ridge axis. Early on April 3, RSMC Nadi initiated advisories on the system and designated it as Tropical Depression 14F, while it was located about 175 km (110 mi) to the north of Labasa, on Vanua Levu. During that day the system slightly accelerated, as it moved towards the south-southeast. Later that day RSMC Nadi reported that the system's low-level circulation was exposed to the northwest of the deep convection, which was moving over northeastern Vanua Levu, Cikobia and other smaller islands. The westerly wind shear around the system subsequently relaxed sufficiently, which allowed the depression to consolidate and the low-level circulation center to move closer to the area of deep convection.

Early on April 4, the depression moved around the northeastern tip of Vanua Levu as bands of atmospheric convection rapidly developed and wrapped into the low-level circulation center. At 0300 UTC while the system was located about 95 km (60 mi) to the south-southeast of Labasa, RSMC Nadi named the depression, Cliff after the system had developed into a category 1 tropical cyclone on the Australian tropical cyclone intensity scale. This was despite gale-force winds not being present near the system's center, as required by the tropical cyclone operational plan for the region. After Cliff had been named gale-force winds rapidly developed near the center, as it continued to intensify and accelerate towards the south-southeast through the Lau group of islands. At around 0900 UTC on April 4, the United States Joint Typhoon Warning Center (JTWC) initiated advisories on the system and designated it as Tropical Cyclone 23P as it became a tropical storm. Over the next 24 hours Cliff continued to intensify, before the JTWC and RSMC Nadi reported during the next day that Cliff had reached its peak intensity with sustained wind-speeds of 100 km/h (65 mph). After peaking in intensity, the system subsequently accelerated further towards the southeast and into an area of cooler seas and higher wind shear. This subsequently caused Cliff to become an extratropical cyclone during February 6, before the system was last noted later that day as it merged with a mid-latitude frontal boundary.

== Preparations and impact ==
=== Fiji ===
Early on April 4, after the system had been named Cliff and started to impact Fiji, RSMC Nadi issued gale warnings for Eastern Vanua Levu, Taveuni, Naitaba, Yacata, Kanacea, Vanua Balavu as well as Vatu Vara.

Cyclone Cliff's main impact on Fiji was to bring further flooding to the northern parts of Fiji which had already been flooded three times during the cyclone season. Cyclone Cliff was also responsible for a landslide which crashed into a Primary School near Udu Point in the eastern part of Vanua Levu. However the 30 Students inside the school at the time all escaped any serious injuries as they fled to safety.

Cyclone Cliff was also responsible for flooded roads, minor damage to buildings as well as cut water supplies in eastern parts of Vanua Levu as well as on Taveuni Island. The people of Taveuni reported the loss of unaccountable acres of crops as the developing cyclone passed close to the island. Extensive damage was also reported in other parts of the Fijian archipelago including damaged crops & Trees as well as roofs being damaged. Cyclone Cliff was also indirectly responsible for one death in Fiji when a woman was swept from a flooded bridge. It is not known how much damage Cyclone Cliff caused.

=== Tonga ===
Late on April 4, RSMC Nadi in conjunction with the Tonga Meteorological Service (TMS) issued a tropical cyclone alert for the islands of Tongatapu and Eu'a and a strong wind warning for central Tonga. A gale warning was subsequently issued during the next day for Tongatapu and Eu'a but were cancelled later that day after the system had started moving away from Tonga.

There was no damage reported in Southern Tonga. However the Tonga's Meteorological Service based in Fua’amotu experienced a power failure on April 4 at 2200 UTC. The standby power could not be restored so therefore operations were shifted to the National Emergency Operations Centre in Nukuʻalofa which is the back up for the Met Service. The National Emergency Operations Centre continued to issue cyclone warnings until the threat posed by Cliff had passed. This was despite the met service being able to continue to operate on a mobile generator.

=== Retirement ===
The name Cliff was later retired by the World Meteorological Organizations, RA V Tropical Cyclone Committee and replaced by Chip.

== See also ==
- List of Southern Hemisphere tropical cyclone seasons
- 2006–07 South Pacific cyclone season
