= Typhoon Emma (1959) =

Pacific typhoon in 1959

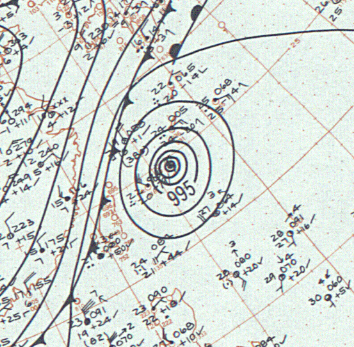
- Surface weather analysis of Typhoon Emma on November 12

Meteorological history
- Formed: November 1, 1959
- Extratropical: November 13, 1959
- Dissipated: November 15, 1959

Unknown-strength storm
- 10-minute sustained (JMA)
- Lowest pressure: 960 hPa (mbar); 28.35 inHg

Category 3-equivalent typhoon
- 1-minute sustained (SSHWS/JTWC)
- Highest winds: 205 km/h (125 mph)
- Lowest pressure: 959 hPa (mbar); 28.32 inHg

Overall effects
- Fatalities: 4 confirmed
- Missing: 2
- Areas affected: Guam • Philippines • Okinawa
- Part of the 1959 Pacific typhoon season

Typhoon Emma was a strong typhoon that struck Okinawa during the 1959 Pacific typhoon season. An area of severe weather formed near Kwajalein Atoll on October 30, and the Japan Meteorological Agency (JMA) began tracking it as a tropical depression on November 1. The Joint Typhoon Warning Center followed suit on November 5 after finding a closed circulation, and the depression received the name Emma. The depression strengthened into a tropical storm west of Guam on November 6 and gradually gained strength. Emma became a typhoon on November 11 near Luzon, and it reached its peak sustained winds of 205 km/h; 125 mph (110 kn) later that day. The typhoon turned northeastwards and grazed Okinawa the next day. Emma steadily weakened and became extratropical on November 13, and the JMA ceased tracking the storm on November 15.

On November 12, Emma caused significant damage in Okinawa, compounding the effects of Typhoon Charlotte in October. Heavy rainfall and strong winds were reported on the islands, flooding the city of Naha and blocking access off to it due to landslides. Shops in the city lost thousands of dollars in merchandise, while crops in the territory were damaged. Minor damage was reported at American military installations, such as Kadena Air Base, where the total damage was worth US$219,586.50. Four people were killed during the storm, and two more were missing. Wind and rain were reported in Guam and the Philippines, and several ships were damaged or sunk by the storm.

== Meteorological history ==
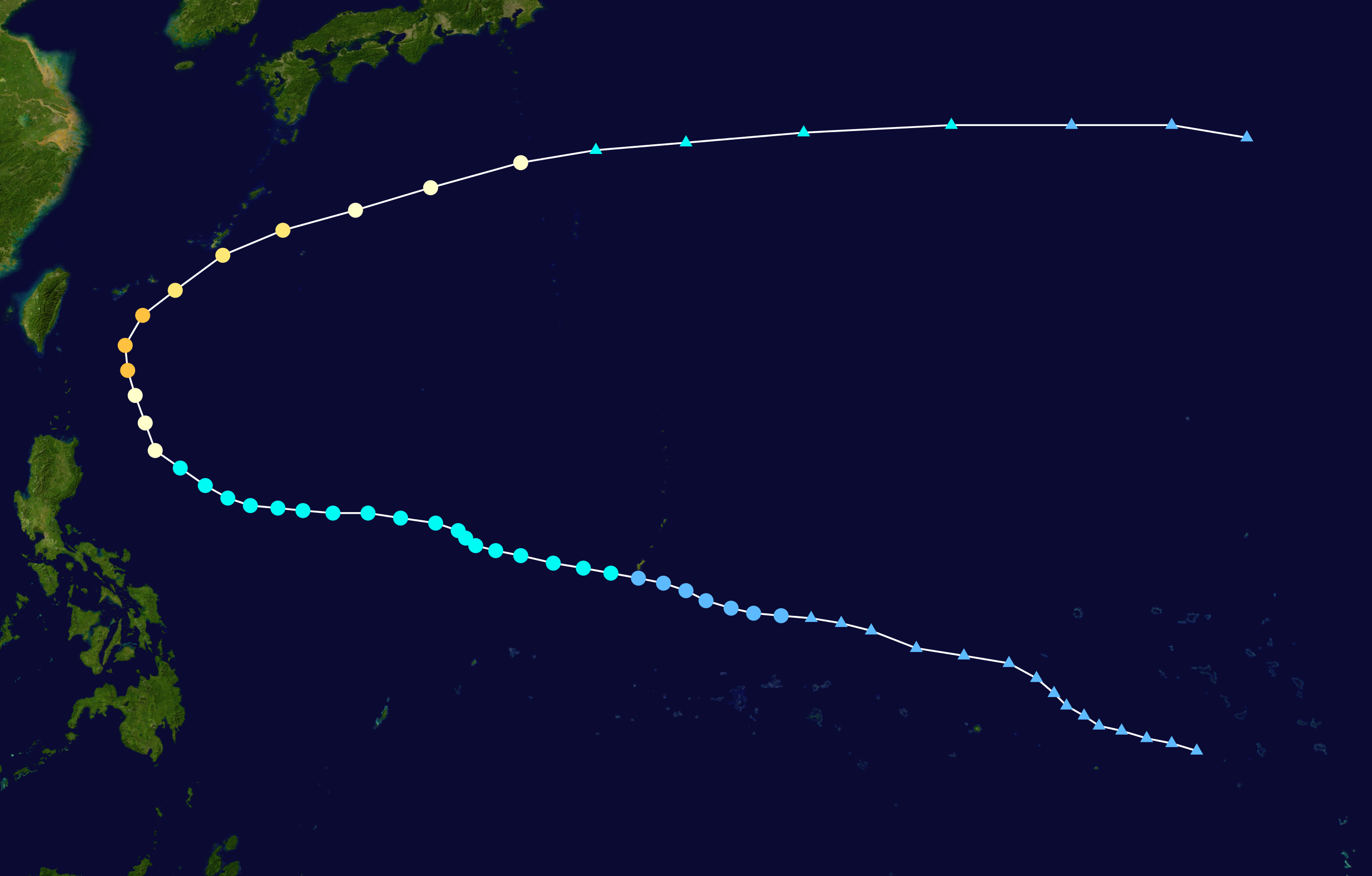
Map plotting the storm's track and intensity, according to the Saffir–Simpson scale Map key Saffir–Simpson scale Tropical depression (≤38 mph, ≤62 km/h) Tropical storm (39–73 mph, 63–118 km/h) Category 1 (74–95 mph, 119–153 km/h) Category 2 (96–110 mph, 154–177 km/h) Category 3 (111–129 mph, 178–208 km/h) Category 4 (130–156 mph, 209–251 km/h) Category 5 (≥157 mph, ≥252 km/h) Unknown Storm type Tropical cyclone Subtropical cyclone Extratropical cyclone, remnant low, tropical disturbance, or monsoon depression

On October 30, 1959, the Joint Typhoon Warning Center (JTWC) began tracking an area of severe weather south of Kwajalein Atoll. Two days later, the Japan Meteorological Agency (JMA) designated the area as a tropical depression. (Note: The Japan Meteorological Agency is the official Regional Specialized Meteorological Center for the western Pacific Ocean.) (Note: The Japan Meteorological Agency's Best Track Data for Typhoon Emma is shown in the 1 Header Line format.) By November 5, a reconnaissance aircraft discovered the area had formed a closed surface circulation, along with wall clouds and sustained winds of 55 km/h; 35 mph (30 kn). (Note: Wind estimates from the JMA and most other basins throughout the world are sustained over 10–minutes, while estimates from the United States-based Joint Typhoon Warning Center are sustained over 1–minute. Sustained 1–minute winds are about 1.14 times the amount of 10 minute winds.) The area was designated as a tropical depression at 06:00 UTC on November 5 by the JTWC, receiving the name Emma. The depression continued west-northwest, traveling past Guam at an average speed of 9–10 knots (17–19 km/h; 10–12 mph). Both the JMA and the JTWC upgraded Emma to a tropical storm at 18:00 UTC on November 6, with sustained winds of 85 km/h; 50 mph (45 kn) and a surface pressure of 990 hectopascals (29.2 inHg). (Note: The Joint Typhoon Warning Center's Best Track Data for Typhoon Emma is shown in the Best Track Data format.) The storm gradually increased in strength, with its eye ill-defined for a majority of the time. At 00:00 UTC on November 11, Emma strengthened into a typhoon east of Luzon, with winds of 120 km/h; 75 mph (65 kn), equivalent to a Category 1 typhoon on the Saffir–Simpson scale, and pressure of 970 hPa (28.6 inHg).

Emma began to turn north at an average speed of 11 knots (20 km/h; 13 mph). At 07:30 UTC on November 11, a reconnaissance aircraft entered the 110-kilometer; 70-mile (60 nmi) eye of Emma and recorded flight-level winds of 195 km/h; 120 mph (105 kn), estimating surface winds of 240 km/h; 150 mph (130 kn). The JTWC assessed the typhoon had reached its peak at 18:00 UTC later that day, with surface winds of 205 km/h; 125 mph (110 kn), equivalent to a Category 3 typhoon on the Saffir–Simpson scale. The JMA reported Emma's lowest surface pressure, 960 hPa (28.3 inHg), at 00:00 UTC on November 12 east of Formosa. After reaching its peak, westerlies began to influence Emma, and the typhoon began to turn northeast and accelerate. Emma weakened to 165 km/h (105 mph) by 12:00 UTC on November 12, while it was southeast of Okinawa. The typhoon continued to increase in speed, and it lost strength throughout November 13. At 18:00 UTC that day, the JTWC discontinued advisories for Emma, as it had transitioned into an extratropical cyclone, with surface winds of 120 km/h; 75 mph (65 kn) and moving at an average speed of 35 kn (65 km/h; 40 mph). The JMA declared the storm as extratropical six hours later, and its surface winds dropped to 100 km/h; 65 mph (55 kn), below typhoon strength. The JTWC ceased tracking the cyclone at 00:00 UTC on November 15, and the JMA stopped 12 hours later, where it was located west of Midway Atoll.

== Preparations and impact ==
As Emma passed through Guam as a tropical depression on November 6, a pressure of 995 hectopascals (29.4 inHg) and sustained winds of 56 km/h; 35 mph (30 kn) were recorded. The depression bought 8.3 centimeters (3.26 in) of rain to the island. In the Philippines, typhoon signal #3 was issued for northern Luzon, and the storm delayed President Carlos P. Garcia's departure from Tagbilaran via ship late on November 12. The ship, RPS Lapu-Lapu, received high winds and waves throughout the day. No damage was reported in Taiwan as the storm turned away.

At sea, several Japanese tankers were damaged by the storm. Nikkai Maru, a tanker carrying timber from the Philippines, was sunk by the storm on November 12, 800 kilometers (500 mi) east of Formosa. The tanker had sprung a leak, and 35 of the 38 members of its crew were rescued by Ryuho Maru, which arrived at Naha on November 15. One member of the Nikkai Maru crew drowned, and two were reported as missing. Another tanker, Yoneyama Maru, had its rudder damaged by driftwood near Ishigaki, causing it to drift. The tanker was rescued by a United States Navy ship. In total, officials reported eight vessels were sunk and eight more were missing, with others reporting 47 vessels that were damaged or sunk. Itoman City Disaster Prevention Council recorded 13 vessels sunk in the city's disaster plan in 2006.

Several preparations were made before Emma struck Okinawa. American servicemen across the territory received warnings and emergency food and water, while remaining in their homes. American military aircraft stationed in the area were evacuated to other areas in East Asia. Nike Hercules missile testing was cancelled for November 14–16 and was rescheduled for the week after. Construction of bleachers for the event was also disrupted. Due to concerns after the landslides caused by Typhoon Charlotte one month earlier, 2,400 residents were evacuated from dangerous areas. There were concerns about food shortages for January 1960, as Charlotte destroyed much of the crops earlier that year.

Emma passed Okinawa to the south by 65 kilometers; 40 miles (35 nmi) late on November 12. At Kadena Air Base, sustained winds of 102 km/h; 63 mph (55 kn) and gusts of 157 km/h; 98 mph (85 kn) were reported. A rainfall total of 129.2 centimeters (50.87 in) was recorded at the air base. A weather station on a hill near Naha reported a gust of 196 km/h; 122 mph (106 kn). Landslides blocked off roads leading to Naha and many trees were uprooted. Power lines were downed and communications were disrupted, preventing an early assessment of damage. The storm caused severe flooding in downtown Naha, with low-lying areas submerged under 2.4 meters (8 ft) of water, forcing residents to move to higher ground. Many shops in the area were damaged by the debris in the flooding, destroying thousands of dollars of merchandise. Crops, which were already damaged by Charlotte, were damaged again by heavy winds and rains. On Amami Ōshima, one-fourth of Nago was flooded by heavy rains. In Ōgimi, nine houses were completely or partially destroyed, and 110 houses were flooded or partially flooded. American military installations in the territory were slightly damaged, with several Marine units reporting flooding and damaged buildings and supplies. At Camp Butler, floodwaters rose up to one meter (40 in), washing debris into one hut Marines resided in. The damage at Kadena Air Base amounted to $219,586.50 (equivalent to $2,425,228 in 2025). At least two people were killed in Okinawa and one fisherman away from the islands during the storm. There were no fatalities or injuries within the number of American servicemen and their dependents. One fisherman previously listed as missing and presumed dead on November 13, Kentoku Kayoda, was found washed ashore after ten days at sea. He survived on rainwater and raw fish, and when he returned home he was able to join a meal of rice cakes which his wife had prepared for his funeral.

Cleanup began soon after Emma passed Okinawa, and electricity was restored to the islands late on November 13. Telephone service returned on the next day. Repairs for roads, culverts, and drainage ditches began in February 1960, using $100,000 (equivalent to $1,088,301 in 2025) of funding requested after the storm hit Okinawa.

== See also ==
- Other storms of the same name
