= Typhoon Emma (1956) =

Pacific typhoon in 1956

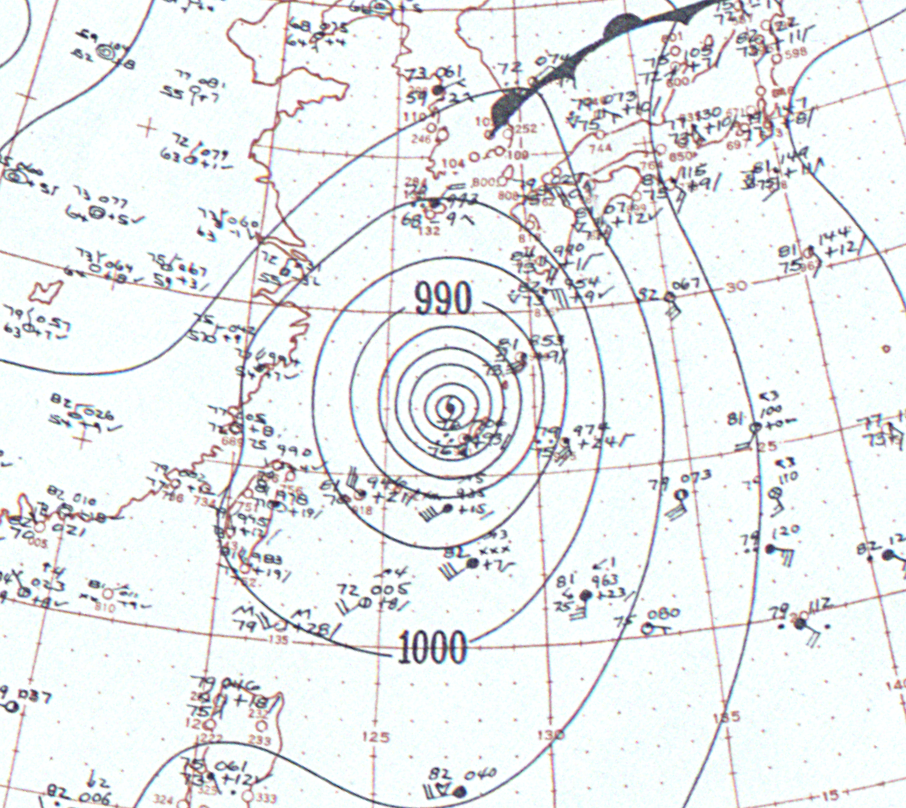
- Emma at peak intensity on September 3

Meteorological history
- Formed: September 1, 1956
- Dissipated: September 11, 1956

Typhoon
- 10-minute sustained (JMA)
- Lowest pressure: 930 hPa (mbar); 27.46 inHg

Category 4-equivalent super typhoon
- 1-minute sustained (SSHWS/JTWC)
- Highest winds: 250 km/h (155 mph)

Overall effects
- Fatalities: 77 direct
- Damage: $8 million (1956 USD)
- Areas affected: Mariana Islands, Izu Islands, Okinawa, Kyūshū, South Korea, China, Soviet Union
- IBTrACS
- Part of the 1956 Pacific typhoon season

Typhoon Emma was a powerful typhoon that brought 140 mph (230 km/h) winds and 22 inches (560 mm) of rain to Okinawa (then US territory of the Ryukyu Islands) and South Korea. Emma left 77 people dead and over $8 million (1956 USD) in damage. Emma was one of several typhoons to cause significant damage to Okinawa during the mid-1950s.

== Meteorological history ==
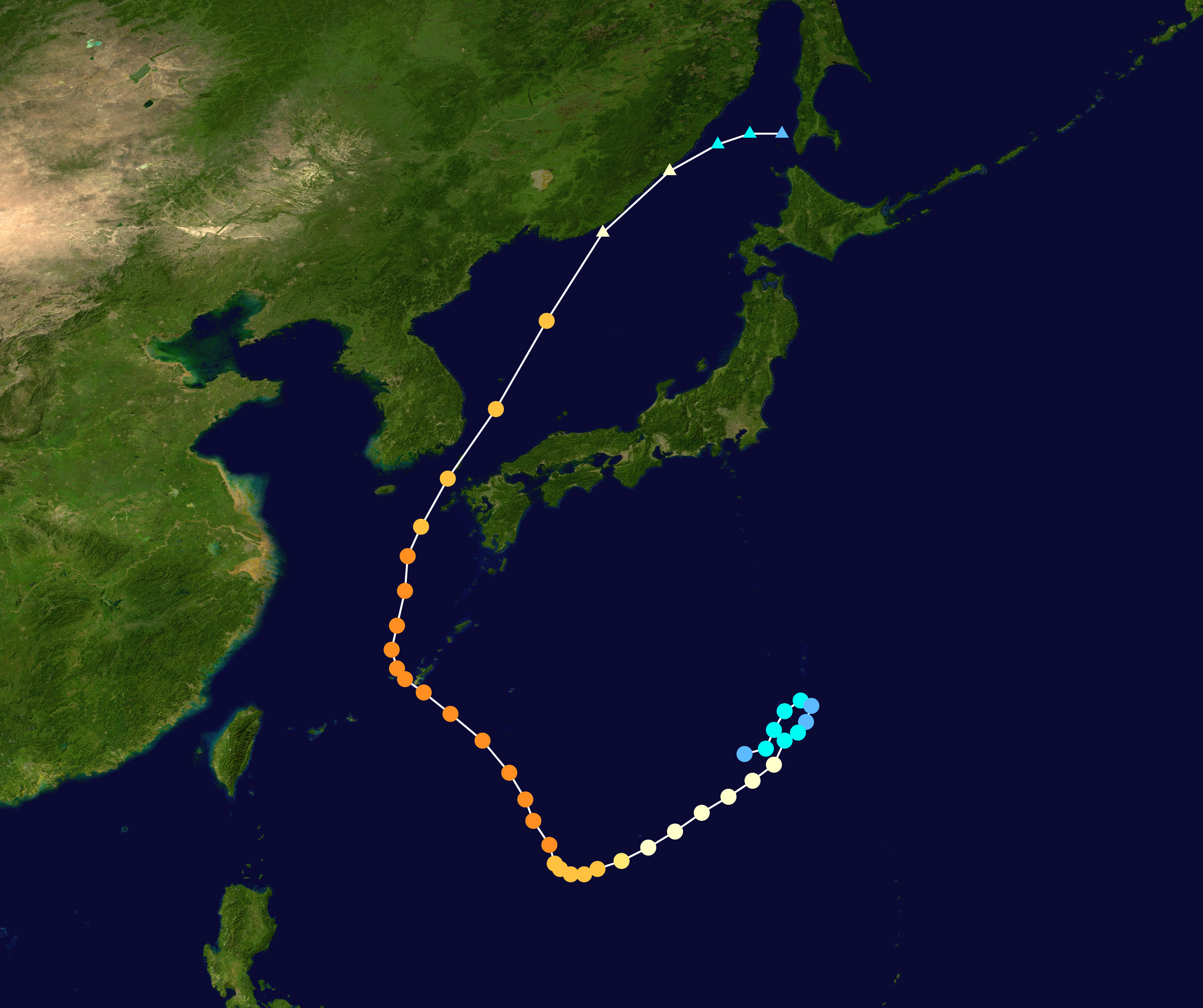
Map plotting the storm's track and intensity, according to the Saffir–Simpson scale Map key Saffir–Simpson scale Tropical depression (≤38 mph, ≤62 km/h) Tropical storm (39–73 mph, 63–118 km/h) Category 1 (74–95 mph, 119–153 km/h) Category 2 (96–110 mph, 154–177 km/h) Category 3 (111–129 mph, 178–208 km/h) Category 4 (130–156 mph, 209–251 km/h) Category 5 (≥157 mph, ≥252 km/h) Unknown Storm type Tropical cyclone Subtropical cyclone Extratropical cyclone, remnant low, tropical disturbance, or monsoon depression

Forming from a tropical disturbance near the Mariana Islands, Emma churned southwest before gaining typhoon status on September 3. Emma then recurved after reaching Category 3 status. Moving west-northwest, Emma reached a peak intensity of 155 mph (249 km/h) as it bypassed Okinawa. Emma then brushed South Korea and Kyūshū as a strong Category 3 typhoon before swinging to the northeast and hitting China and the far eastern Soviet Union.

== Preparations ==
The Tokyo Weather Center began to issue warnings when Emma was spotted on September 3, east-southeast of Iwo Jima. During the preparations, bread and milk were stocked and U.S. installations in Okinawa were placed on alert. An army hospital in Ryūkyū was evacuated as patients were transferred to storm shelters where they had pie and beans.

== Impact ==
Emma killed 77 people and caused $8–12 million (1956 dollars) in damage across Okinawa and South Korea.

=== Okinawa ===
Most heeded typhoon watches, either evacuating or bolting storm shutters and stowing away light equipment. On Okinawa's eastern beaches however, more than a dozen marines who were unaware of the danger came to the beaches eager to surf in the thundering waves. Eleven of the Marines had already paddled out into open water when they realized the danger, but it was too late. A strong rip current had overwhelmed the soldiers and all eleven marines drowned.

When the storm struck, it brought 143 mph (230 km/h) gusts that ripped apart runways and smashed hangars. Heavy rains brought flashfloods that damaged homes and buildings. A total of 1,059 millimetres (41.7 in) fell at Kadena Air Force Base in 21 hours on September 8. By the time Emma left the battered island, there was $8 million (1956 US dollars) in damage.

The U.S.-held island of Okinawa was hard hit by Emma. Numerous planes, runways and barracks were either damaged or destroyed. The island was in the recovering phases when in 1957, Typhoon Faye, another powerful typhoon did the same damage ($11.3 million (1957 dollars)). Later the island was struck again by Typhoon Charlotte of 1959.

=== Elsewhere ===
On Kyūshū, Emma brought 22 inches of rain that caused extensive flooding which left 34 people dead and thousands homeless. At its landfall near South Korea. Emma sank dozens of ships and wrecked homes and buildings. In all 42 people were dead and 35 missing, most of them fishermen.

=== Loss of a hurricane hunter ===
Emma was also one of the few tropical cyclones to down a plane. It was a Boeing RB-50 hurricane hunter plane, which was sent up to study wind velocities in the storm's right front quadrant. The plane went down in the storm, taking all 16 crew members with it. Although no direct cause was stated, it was speculated that the winds of the typhoon caused the airplane to go into a tailspin. Another theory was that the low pressures caused the plane's altimeters to give a false reading, and that caused the pilots to assume that they were flying much higher than they actually were, causing them to continue flying on their assumed altitude until they crashed. The theory was also applied to what happened to a hurricane hunter which crashed during Hurricane Janet in 1955.

== See also ==
- Other storms of the same name

== Sources ==
=== Book ===
- David Longshore. "Typhoon Emma." Encyclopedia of Hurricanes, Typhoons and Cyclones. David Longshore. New York: Facts on File, 1998, Pg; 113-114.

=== World Wide Web ===
- Typhoon Emma Report at the United States Army Center of Military History
- JMA General Information of Typhoon Emma (5612) from Digital Typhoon
- Disaster Information of Typhoon Emma (5612) from Digital Typhoon
- Unisys (Typhoon Emma track)
- Unisys (Typhoon Emma Best track data from JTWC)
