= List of storms named Charlotte =

The name Charlotte has been used for nine tropical cyclones worldwide: four in the West Pacific Ocean, two in the Australian region, two in the South Pacific, and one in the South-West Indian Ocean.

In the West Pacific:

- Typhoon Charlotte (1946) (T4602) – remained in the open ocean.
- Tropical Storm Charlotte (1952) (T5201) – formed in the South China Sea and made landfall near Hong Kong.
- Tropical Storm Charlotte (1956) (T5610) – made landfall in the Philippines and then in Vietnam.
- Typhoon Charlotte (1959) (T5918, 42W) – damaging Category 5 super typhoon that remained out to sea.

In the Australian region:

- Tropical Cyclone Charlotte (2009) – formed in the Gulf of Carpentaria and made landfall near the mouth of the Gilbert River.
- Cyclone Charlotte (2022) – a Category 4 severe tropical cyclone that affected Indonesia and East Timor.

In the South-West Indian Ocean:

- Tropical Storm Charlotte (1973) – a weak tropical storm passed southwest of Réunion, rainfall damaged crops and flooded roads, causing one person to drown.

In the South Pacific:

- Cyclone Charlotte – existed during the 1958–59 season.
- Tropical Depression Charlotte (1975) – a short-lived tropical depression.

== See also ==
- List of storms named Carlotta – a similar name that has been used in the Australian region and East Pacific tropical cyclone basins
