= List of storms named Emma =

The name Emma has been used for thirteen tropical cyclones and for two extratropical cyclones worldwide. Of the tropical systems, nine were in the West Pacific Ocean, three were in the Australian region, and one was in the South-West Indian Ocean. The two extratropical systems were both European windstorms.

In the West Pacific:

- Typhoon Emma (1952) (T5203)
- Typhoon Emma (1956) (T5612) – Category 4 typhoon that affected Okinawa and South Korea, killing 77.
- Typhoon Emma (1959) (T5920, 46W)
- Typhoon Emma (1962) (T6222, 73W) – damage in Guam and Saipan totaled out to $250,000.
- Tropical Storm Emma (1965) (T6510, 12W, Ibiang)
- Typhoon Emma (1967) (T6735, 37W, Welming) – a Category 5 typhoon that struck the Philippines leaving 300 dead and 60 missing
- Tropical Storm Emma (1971) (T7109, 09W, Ising)
- Tropical Storm Emma (1974) (T7406, 07W, Klaring)
- Tropical Storm Emma (1977) (T7711, 13W)

In the Australian region:

- Cyclone Emma (1984)
- Cyclone Emma (1995)
- Cyclone Emma (2006)

In the South-West Indian:

- Cyclone Emma (1963)

In Europe:

- Cyclone Emma (2008) – passed through Central Europe
- Storm Emma (2018) – brought heavy snow falls

== See also ==
- Hurricane Emmy (1976) – an Atlantic Ocean tropical cyclone with a similar name
