= List of storms named Carlotta =

The name Carlotta has been used for twelve tropical cyclones in the Eastern Pacific Ocean and one in the Australian region of the South Pacific.

In the Eastern Pacific:

- Hurricane Carlotta (1967) – Category 1 hurricane, did not make landfall.
- Hurricane Carlotta (1971) – Category 1 hurricane, no land was affected.
- Hurricane Carlotta (1975) – Category 3 hurricane, did not come near land.
- Hurricane Carlotta (1978) – Category 4 hurricane, did not affect land.
- Tropical Storm Carlotta (1982), moved parallel to Mexico but did not make landfall.
- Hurricane Carlotta (1988) – Category 1 hurricane, did not make landfall.
- Hurricane Carlotta (1994) – Category 2 hurricane, churned in the open ocean.
- Hurricane Carlotta (2000) – a Category 4 hurricane that killed 18 after sinking a freighter.
- Hurricane Carlotta (2006) – a Category 1 hurricane that remained at sea.
- Hurricane Carlotta (2012) – Category 2 hurricane that made landfall near Puerto Escondido, Mexico.
- Tropical Storm Carlotta (2018), brushed the southwestern coast of Mexico without making landfall.
- Hurricane Carlotta (2024) – Category 1 hurricane that stayed at sea.

In the Australian region:

- Cyclone Carlotta (1972) – remained well off the Queensland coast.

A variation of the name, Karlotta has also been used for one European windstorm.

- Storm Karlotta (2024) – brought heavy rainfall warnings in several portions of Europe.

== See also ==
- List of storms named Charlotte – a similar name that has been used in four tropical cyclone basins
