= 1956 Pacific typhoon season =

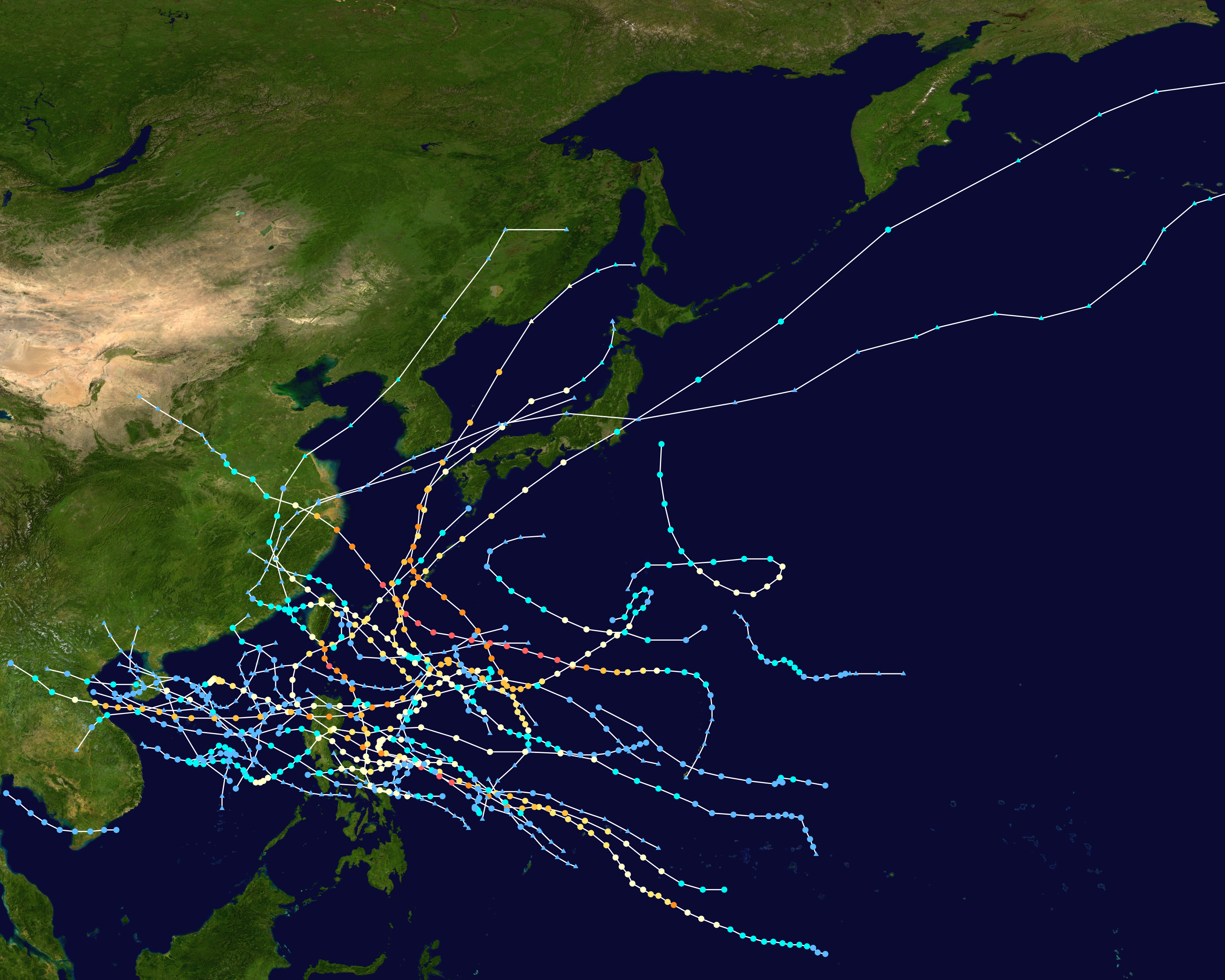
- Season summary map

Seasonal boundaries
- First system formed: January 18, 1956
- Last system dissipated: January 1, 1957

Strongest storm
- Name: Wanda
  - Maximum winds: 295 km/h (185 mph)
  - Lowest pressure: 902 hPa (mbar)

Seasonal statistics
- Total depressions: 39
- Total storms: 26
- Typhoons: 18
- Very strong typhoons: 5 (unofficial)
- Total fatalities: >5,980
- Total damage: > $60.5 million (1956 USD)

Related articles
- 1956 Atlantic hurricane season; 1956 Pacific hurricane season; 1950s North Indian Ocean cyclone seasons

The 1956 Pacific typhoon season has no official bounds; it ran year-round in 1956, but most tropical cyclones tend to form in the northwestern Pacific Ocean between June and December. These dates conventionally delimit the period of each year when most tropical cyclones form in the northwestern Pacific Ocean.

The scope of this article is limited to the Pacific Ocean, north of the equator and west of the International Date Line. Storms that form east of the date line and north of the equator are called hurricanes; see 1956 Pacific hurricane season. Tropical storms forming in the entire west Pacific basin were assigned a name by the Fleet Weather Center on Guam.

== Seasonal summary ==
A total of 39 tropical cyclones are made in the Western Pacific Basin. Of all the 39 tropical cyclones made, 23 of them reached tropical storm strength, 15 of them reached typhoon strength, and 3 of them reached the super typhoon strength. The rest of the storms, such as unnumbered and unnamed tropical depressions and storms, are only classified by the CMA while the JMA is sometimes rare before the 1960s - 1970s.

== Systems ==
=== Typhoon Sarah ===
- Typhoon (JMA)
- Category 4 typhoon (SSHWS)
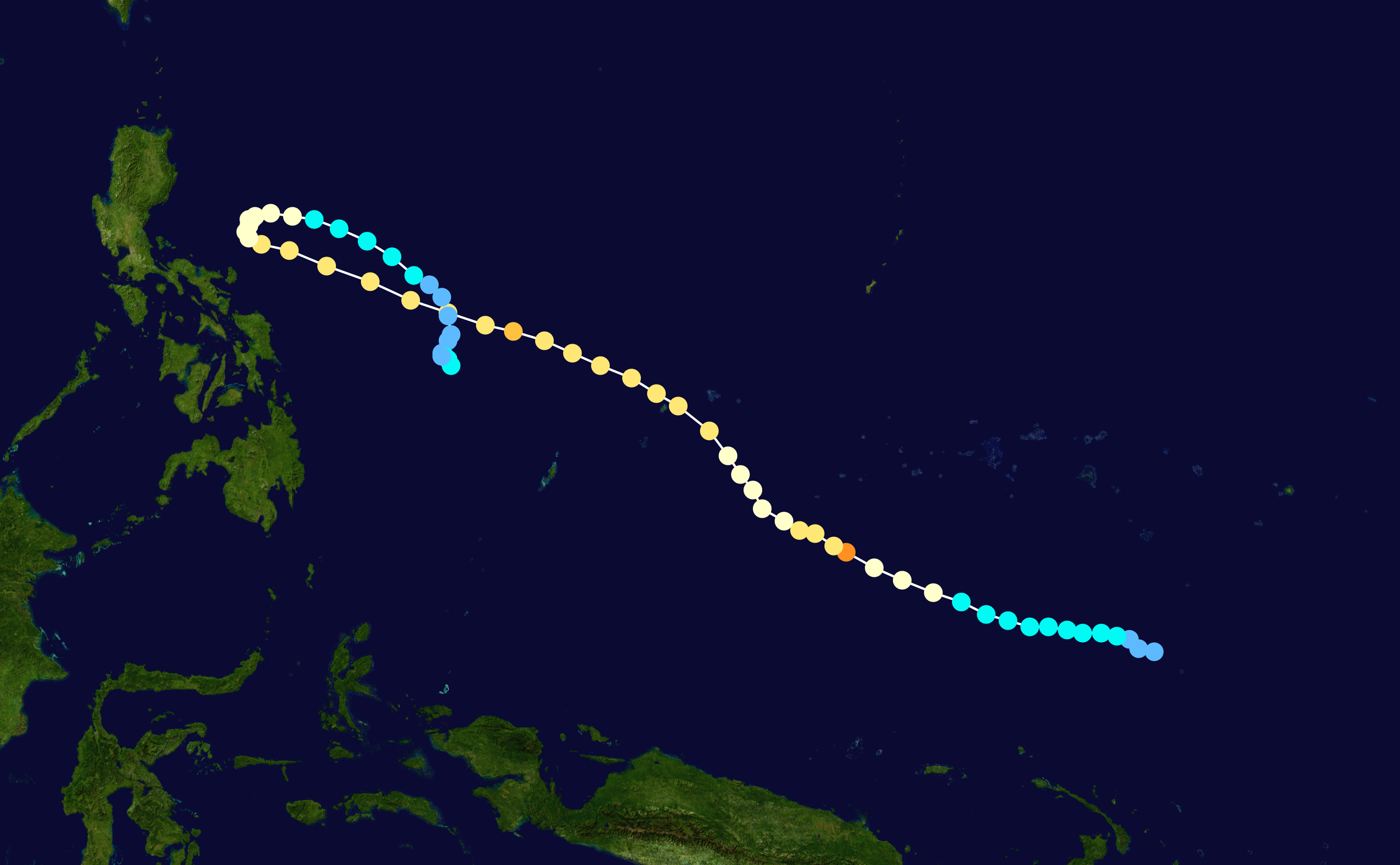
- Duration: March 21 – April 5
- Peak intensity: 215 km/h (130 mph) (1-min); 970 hPa (mbar)

Typhoon Sarah formed at a low latitude on March 21 and took a generally northwest heading. On the 31st as it approached the Philippine islands, it slowed then reversed its direction dissipating on April 4.

=== Tropical Storm 02W ===
- Tropical storm (JMA)
- Tropical storm (SSHWS)
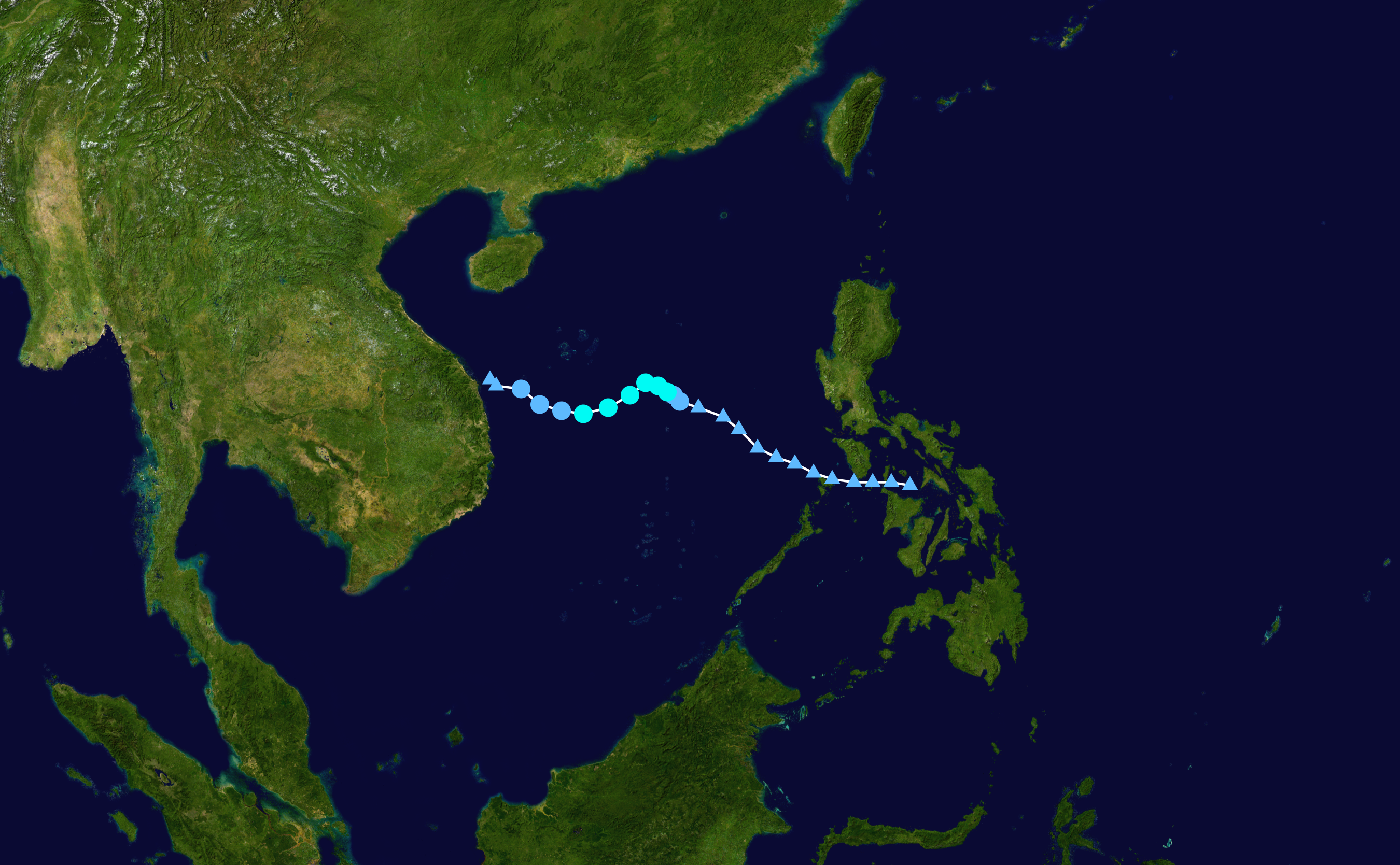
- Duration: April 10 – April 15
- Peak intensity: 85 km/h (50 mph) (1-min); 1001 hPa (mbar)

Tropical Storm 02W formed on April 10. It hit Philippines as a tropical depression. It move westward hitting Vietnam dissipating on April 15.

=== Super Typhoon Thelma ===
- Typhoon (JMA)
- Category 5 super typhoon (SSHWS)
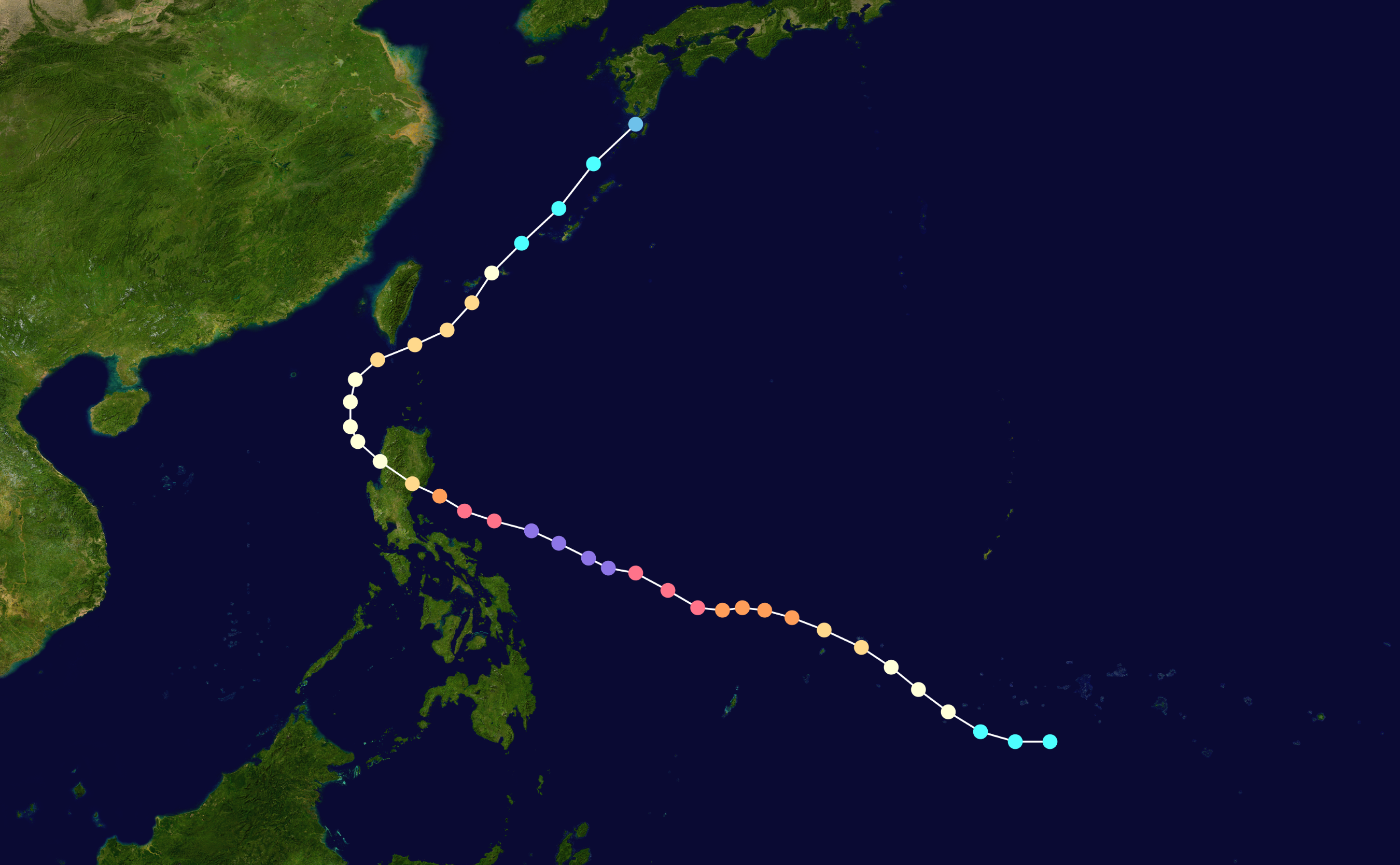
- Duration: April 16 – April 25
- Peak intensity: 285 km/h (180 mph) (1-min); 935 hPa (mbar)

On April 16, Thelma formed near the formation place of typhoon Sarah. Thelma struck the Philippine Islands on April 21 and passed close to Formosa on April 23 then struck Japan. The U.S. Navy Fleet Weather Central in Guam stopped following Thelma on April 25.

=== Tropical Storm 04W ===
- Tropical storm (JMA)
- Tropical storm (SSHWS)
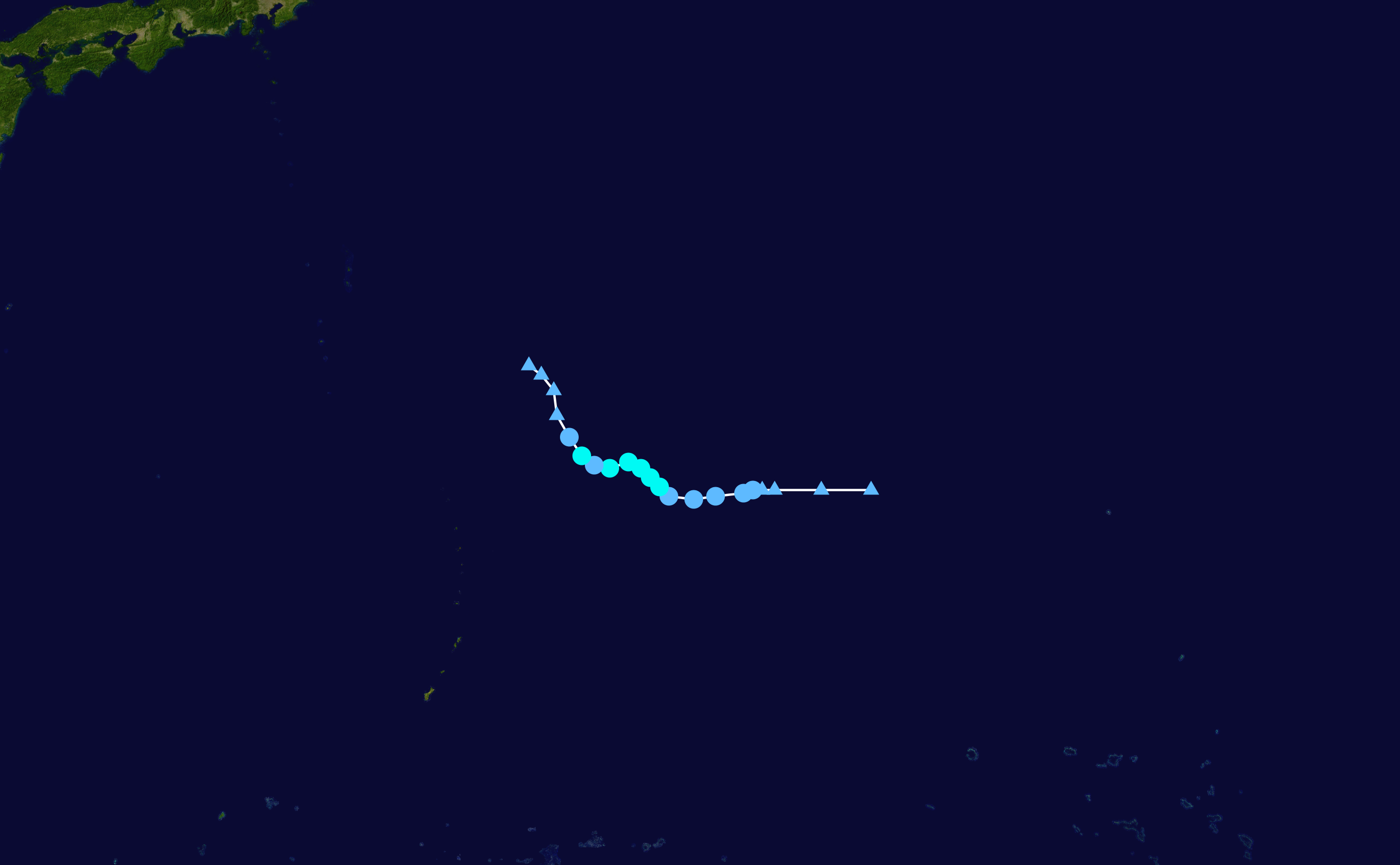
- Duration: June 16 – June 21
- Peak intensity: 85 km/h (50 mph) (1-min); 1000 hPa (mbar)

04W was a short-lived tropical storm that remained out at sea.

=== Typhoon Vera ===
- Typhoon (JMA)
- Category 1 typhoon (SSHWS)
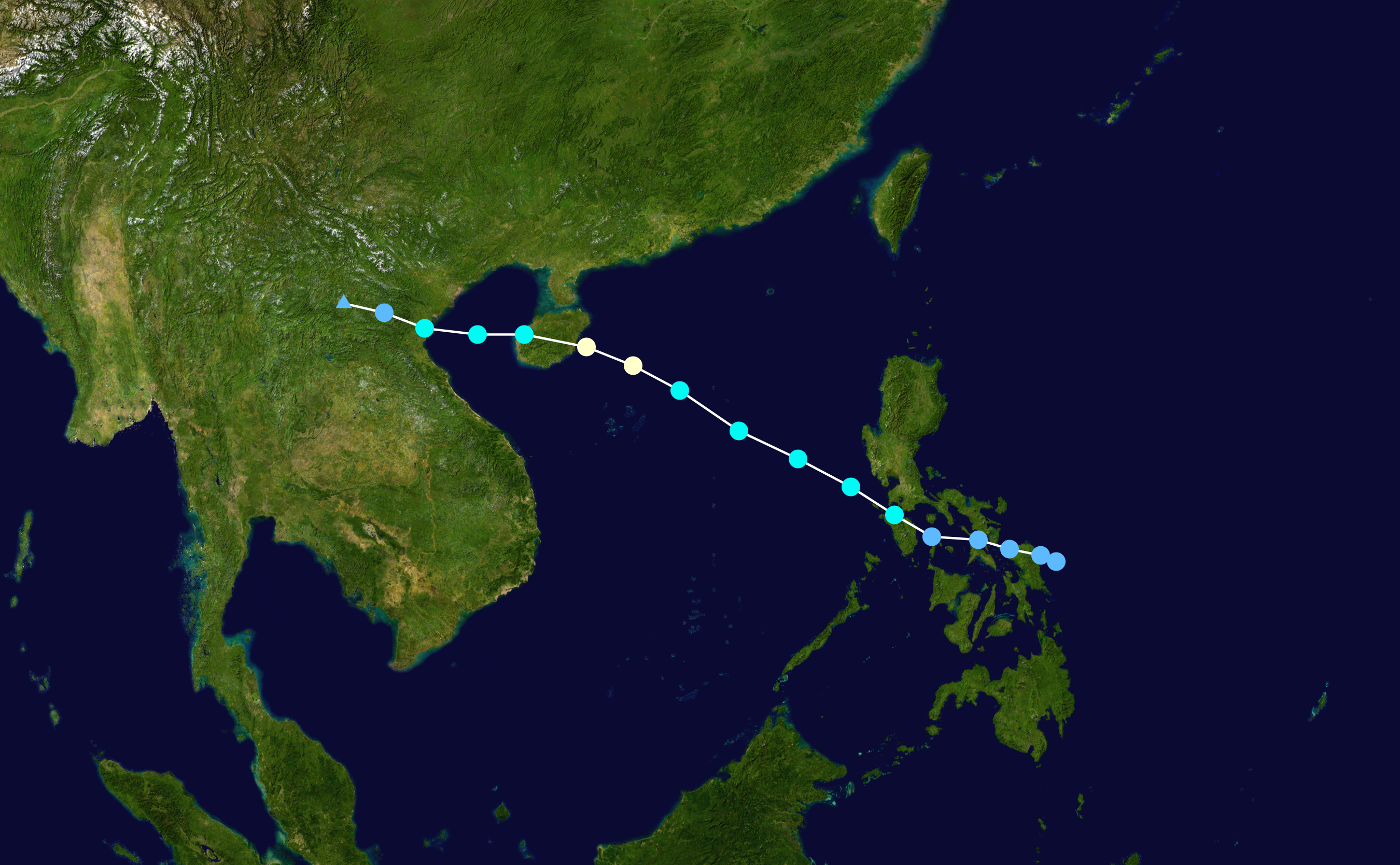
- Duration: July 5 – July 9
- Peak intensity: 150 km/h (90 mph) (1-min); 982 hPa (mbar)

The lowest atmospheric pressure recorded on July 8 at a weather station in Hanoi (elevation 5 meters above sea level) was 976.3 hPa (28.83 inHg).

=== Super Typhoon Wanda ===
- Typhoon (JMA)
- Category 5 super typhoon (SSHWS)
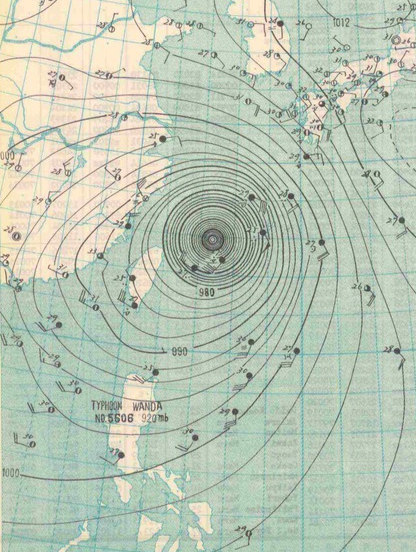
- Duration: July 25 – August 5
- Peak intensity: 295 km/h (185 mph) (1-min); 902 hPa (mbar)

A tropical depression developed southwest of Guam on July 25. It moved north-northeastward, passing east of the Northern Marianas. On July 27, it intensified into a tropical storm and was designated Wanda. On the same day, the storm turned more westward, steered by the subtropical ridge to the north. Low wind shear and warm waters allowed Wanda to intensify steadily, developing into an intense typhoon. On July 30, reconnaissance aircraft recorded a minimum pressure of 902 mbar (26.6 inHg), and the peak winds were estimated at 295 km/h (183 mph). After passing through the Miyako Islands, Wanda weakened slightly and traversed the East China Sea. On August 1, the typhoon made landfall in eastern China near Zhoushan, Zhejiang, producing a pressure of 923 mbar (27.3 inHg); this was the lowest pressure recorded in China from a tropical cyclone. Wanda slowly weakened while progressing through China, dissipating on August 5.

Taipei on Taiwan recorded 297.3 mm (11.70 in) of rainfall over three days while the typhoon passed to the north. Along the coast of Zhejiang, Wanda produced a 5.02 m (16.5 ft) storm surge that destroyed 465 seawalls and 902 boats. The storm also flooded crop fields, destroying 20,380 tons of wheat. Across Zhejiang, 2.2 million houses and 38.5% of the main roads were damaged during the storm. Nationwide, Wanda killed 4,935 people and injured 16,617 others.

=== Typhoon Amy ===
- Typhoon (JMA)
- Category 1 typhoon (SSHWS)
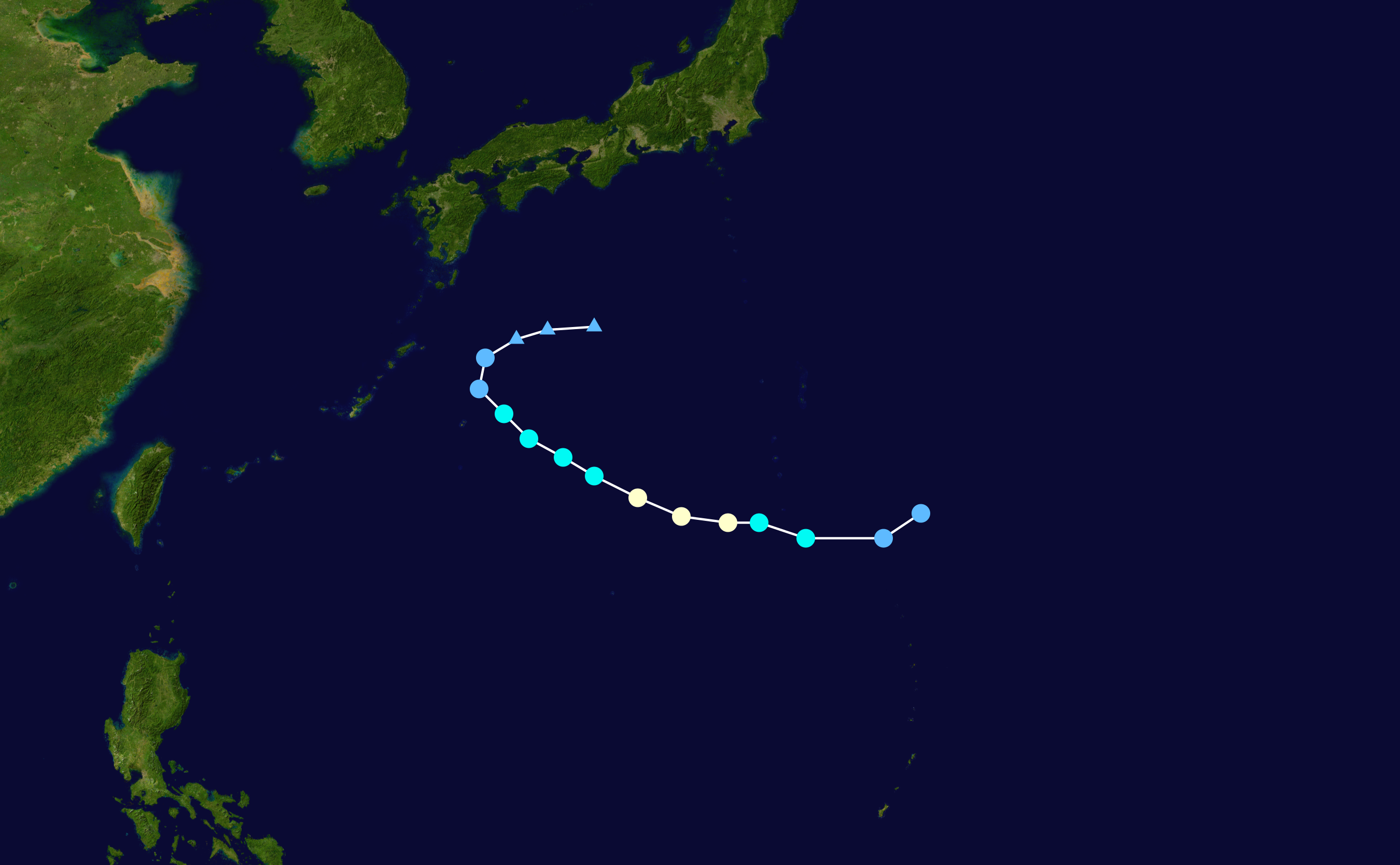
- Duration: August 2 – August 6
- Peak intensity: 130 km/h (80 mph) (1-min); 965 hPa (mbar)

Amy was a Category 1 typhoon that didn't affect land.

=== Tropical Storm 08W ===
- Tropical storm (JMA)
- Tropical storm (SSHWS)
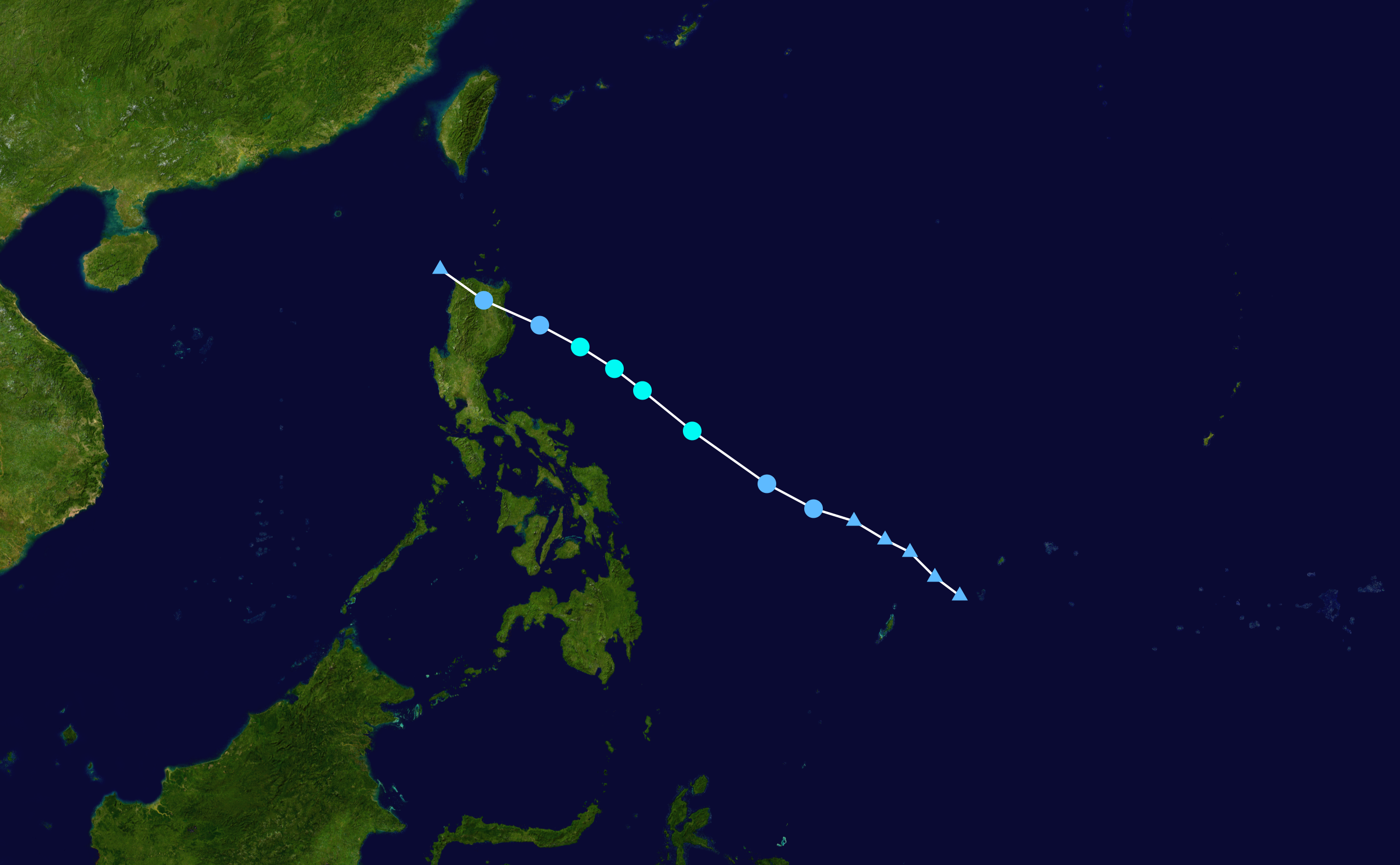
- Duration: August 7 – August 10
- Peak intensity: 75 km/h (45 mph) (1-min); 998 hPa (mbar)

08W hit the Philippines as a tropical storm.

=== Typhoon Babs ===
- Typhoon (JMA)
- Category 3 typhoon (SSHWS)
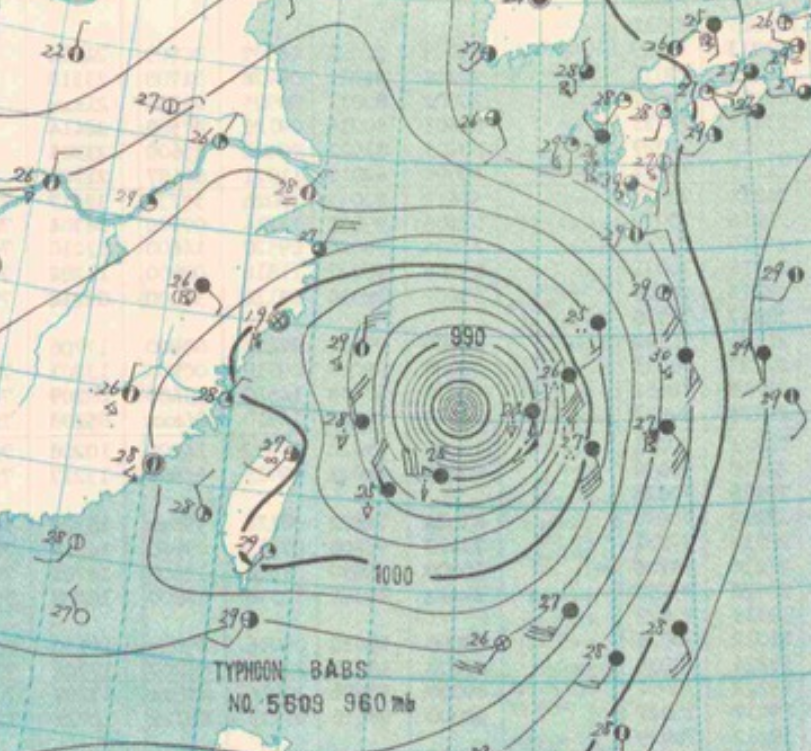
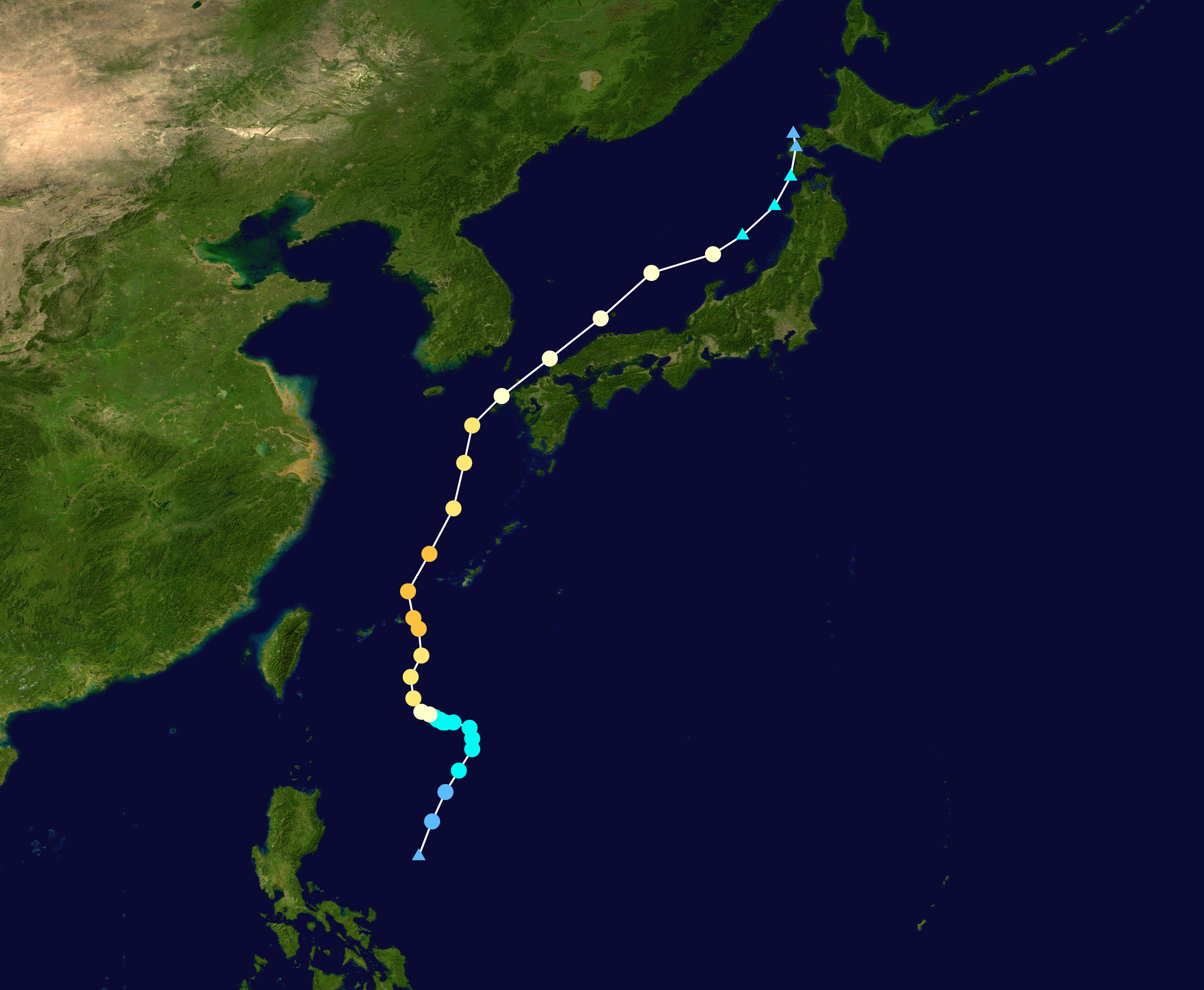
- Duration: August 10 – August 19
- Peak intensity: 195 km/h (120 mph) (1-min); 960 hPa (mbar)

Babs impacted Japan and Korea.

=== Typhoon Charlotte ===
- Typhoon (JMA)
- Category 3 typhoon (SSHWS)
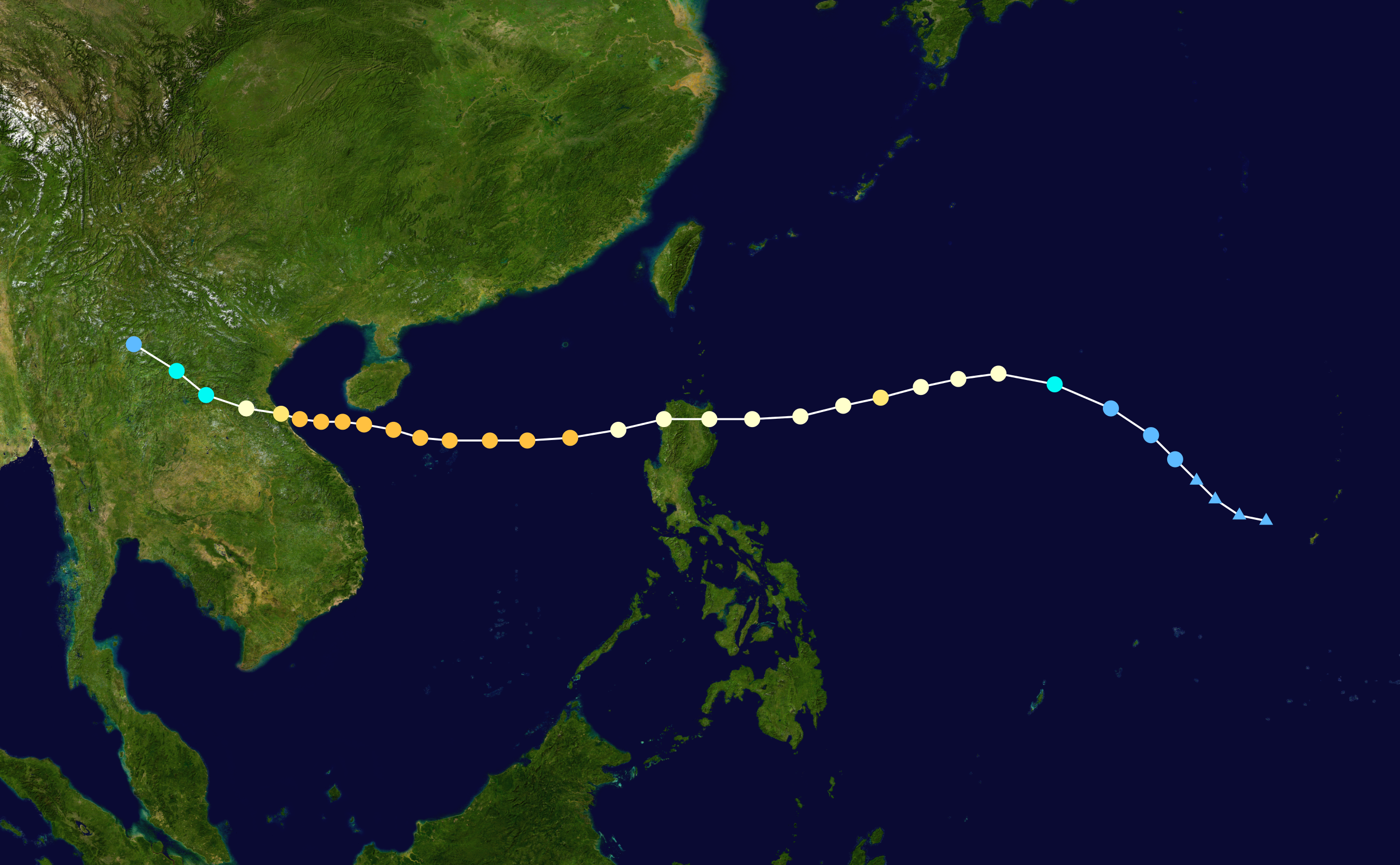
- Duration: August 25 – September 2
- Peak intensity: 205 km/h (125 mph) (1-min); 970 hPa (mbar)

Chatlotte formed east of the Philippines on August 25. It hit Luzon as a category 1 typhoon. The storm rapidly intensified into a category 3 typhoon and hit Vietnam.

=== Typhoon Dinah ===
- Typhoon (JMA)
- Category 2 typhoon (SSHWS)
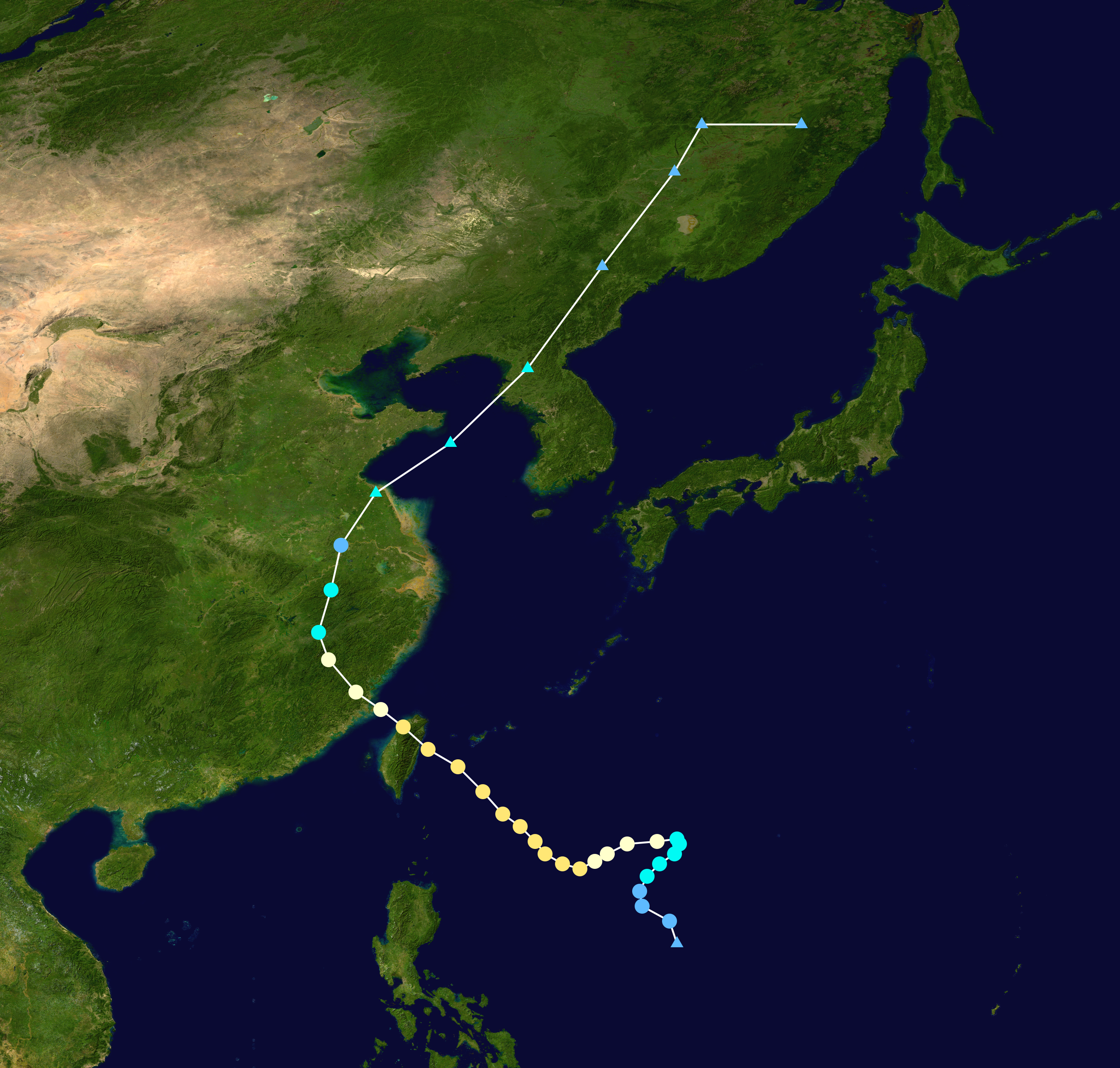
- Duration: August 28 – September 5
- Peak intensity: 175 km/h (110 mph) (1-min); 970 hPa (mbar)

Typhoon Dinah was formed on August 25. The storm increased rapidly before hitting northern Taiwan. The typhoon made landfall on Fujian before turning through China and North Korea. It dissipated over the Soviet Union on September 5.

=== Super Typhoon Emma ===
- Typhoon (JMA)
- Category 4 super typhoon (SSHWS)
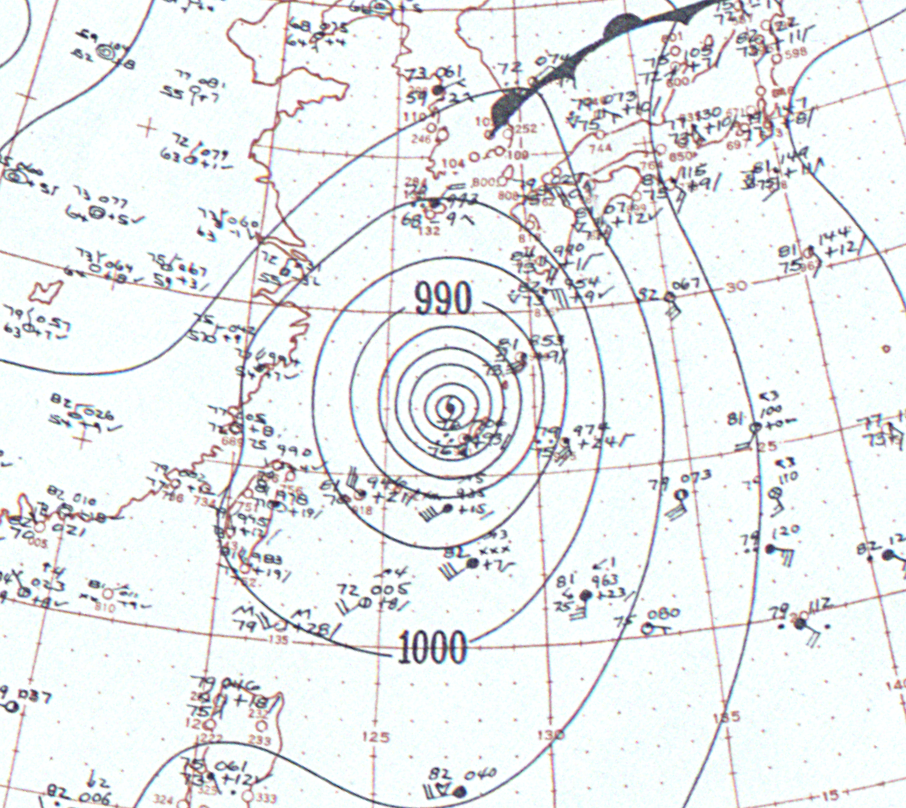
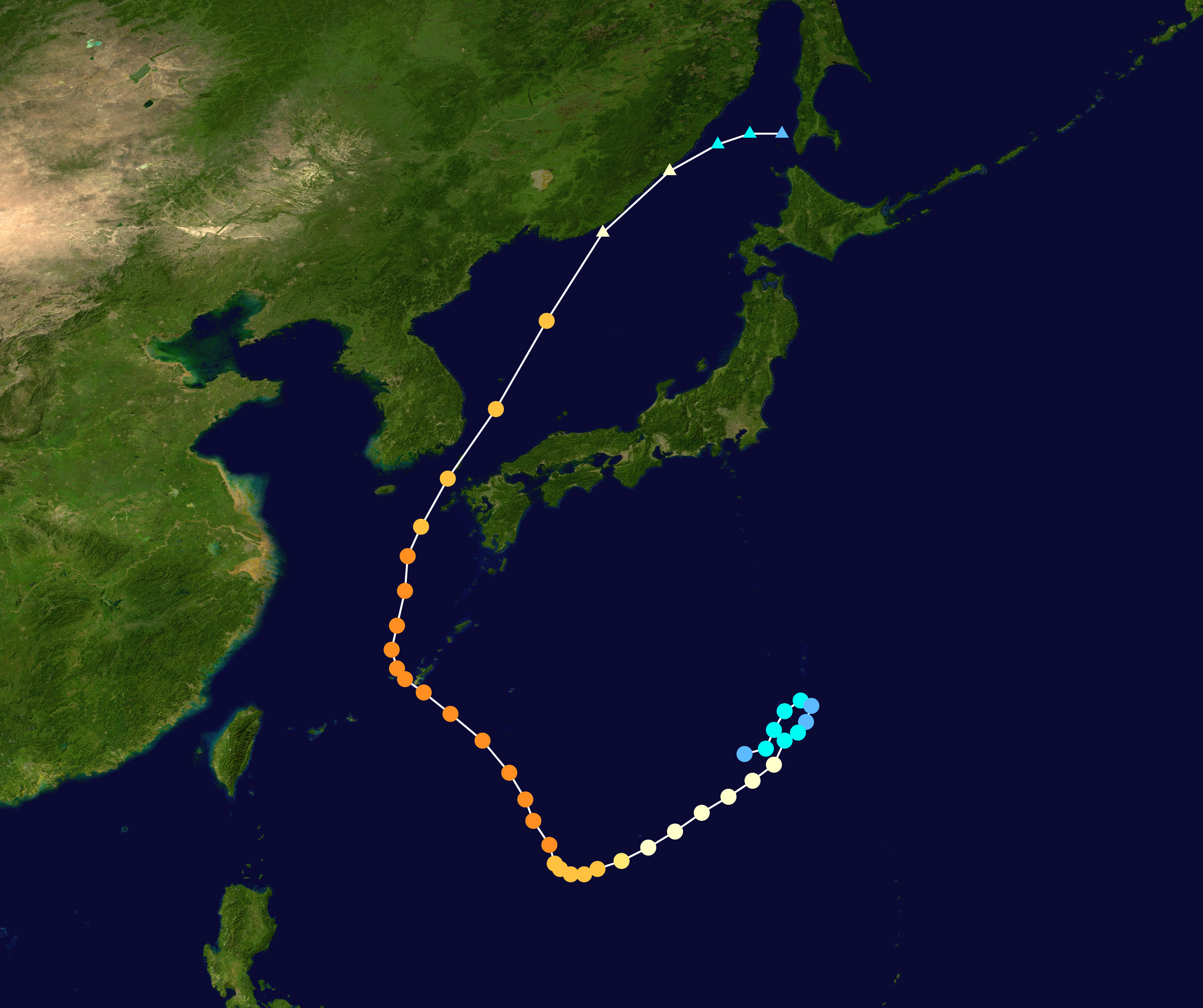
- Duration: September 1 – September 11
- Peak intensity: 250 km/h (155 mph) (1-min); 930 hPa (mbar)

Emma was a powerful typhoon that brought 145 mph (233 km/h) winds and 22 inches (560 mm) of rain to Okinawa (then the US territory of the Ryukyu Islands) and South Korea. Emma left 77 people dead and over $8 million (1956 USD) in damage. Forming from a tropical disturbance near the Mariana Islands, Emma churned southwest before gaining typhoon status on September 3. Emma then recurved after reaching category 3 status. Moving west-northwest, Emma reached a peak intensity of 155 mph (249 km/h) as it bypassed Okinawa. Emma also brushed South Korea and Kyushu as a strong category 3 typhoon. On Kyushu, Emma brought 22 inches of rain that caused extensive flooding with left 34 people dead and thousands homeless. On South Korea, Emma sank dozens of ships and wrecked homes and buildings. In all 42 people were dead and 35 missing, most of them are fishermen. On Okinawa, most headed typhoon watches are choosing to evacuate or bolting storm shutters and stowing avay light equipment. A strong rip current had overwhelmed the soldiers and all of the eleven marines drowned. When Emma hit Okinawa, it brought 145 mph (233 km/h) gusts that ripped apart runways and smashed hangars. Heavy rains brought flashfloods that damaged homes and buildings. A total of 1,059 millimetres (41.7 inches) fell at Kadena Air Force Base in 21 hours on September 8. The U.S. held island of Okinawa was hard hit by Emma. Numerous planes, runways, and barracks are damaged. Emma left on hat battering island, leaving $8 million (1956 US dollars in damage). Emma then dissipated on September 11. Emma was one of the several typhoons that cause significant damage to Okinawa during the mid-1950s.

=== Typhoon Freda ===
- Typhoon (JMA)
- Category 2 typhoon (SSHWS)
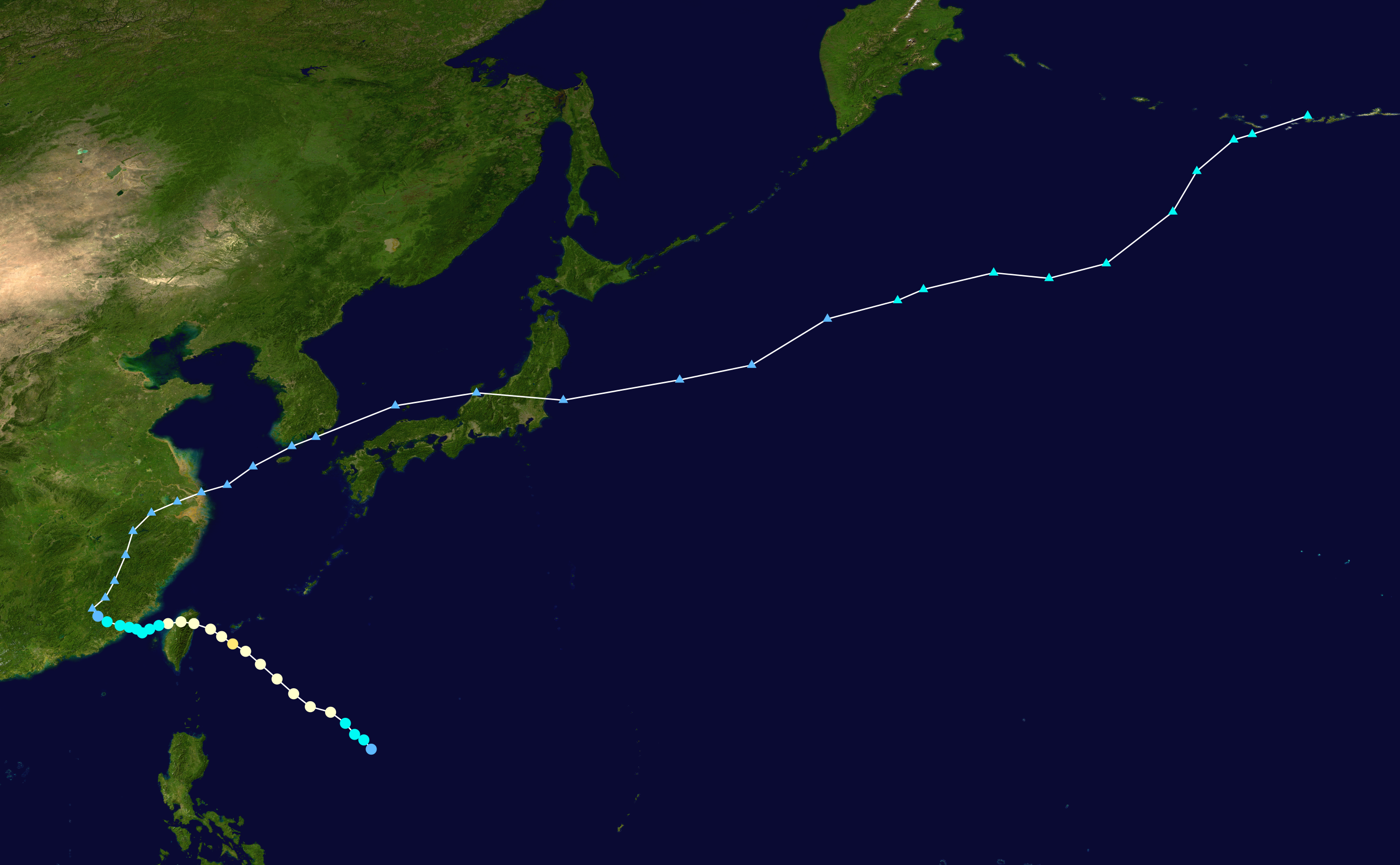
- Duration: September 13 – September 20
- Peak intensity: 165 km/h (105 mph) (1-min); 975 hPa (mbar)

Freda hit Taiwan and China. Its remnants spread all the way to the Alaskan Islands.

=== Super Typhoon Gilda ===
- Typhoon (JMA)
- Category 5 super typhoon (SSHWS)
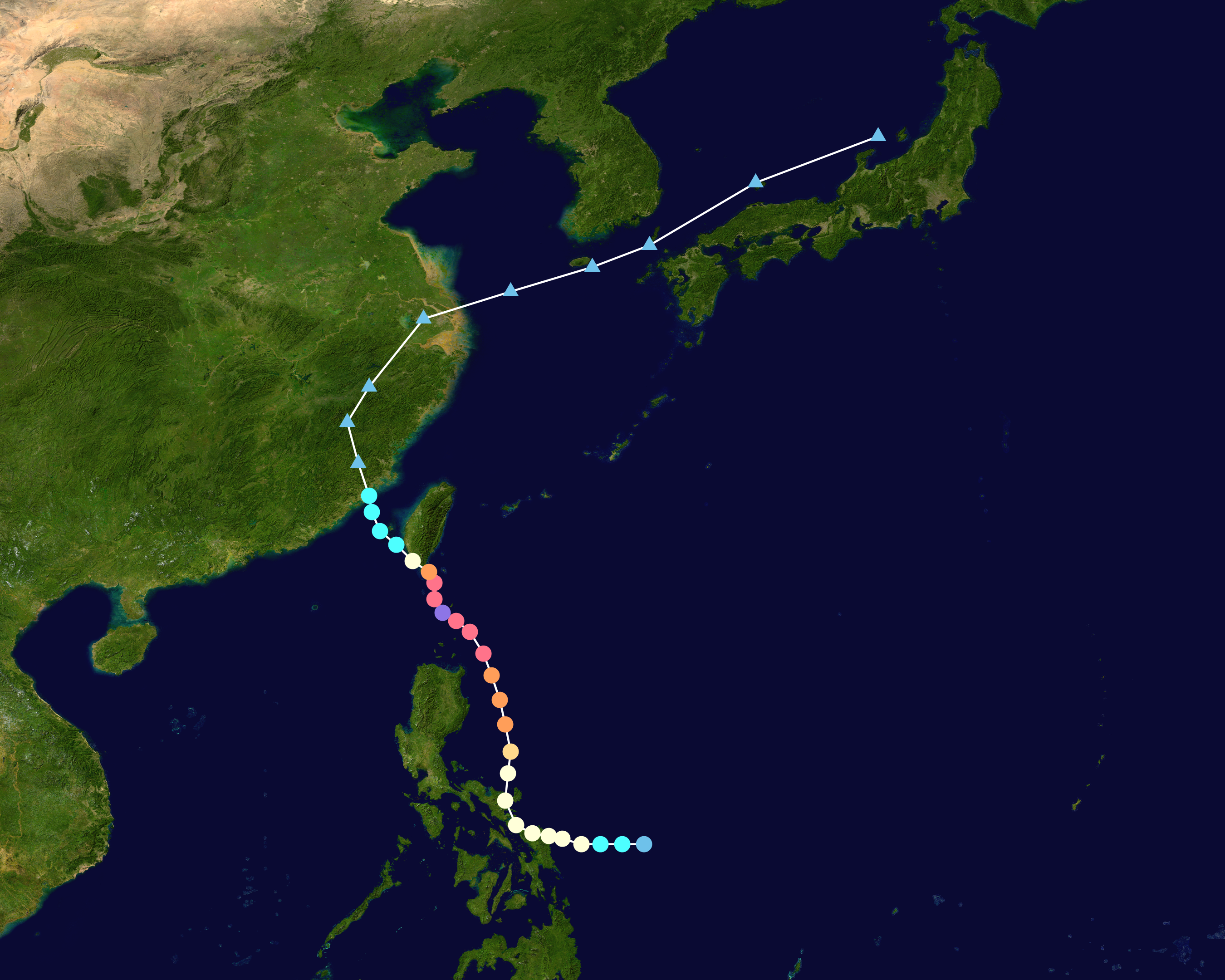
- Duration: September 17 – September 24
- Peak intensity: 280 km/h (175 mph) (1-min); 936 hPa (mbar)

Gilda formed just east of the Philippines on September 17. It hit the Philippines as a category 1 typhoon. After landfall, Gilda moved northward, rapidly strengthened into a Category 5 super typhoon. It later made landfall in Taiwan and Fujian and dissipated on September 24

=== Typhoon Harriet ===
- Typhoon (JMA)
- Category 3 typhoon (SSHWS)
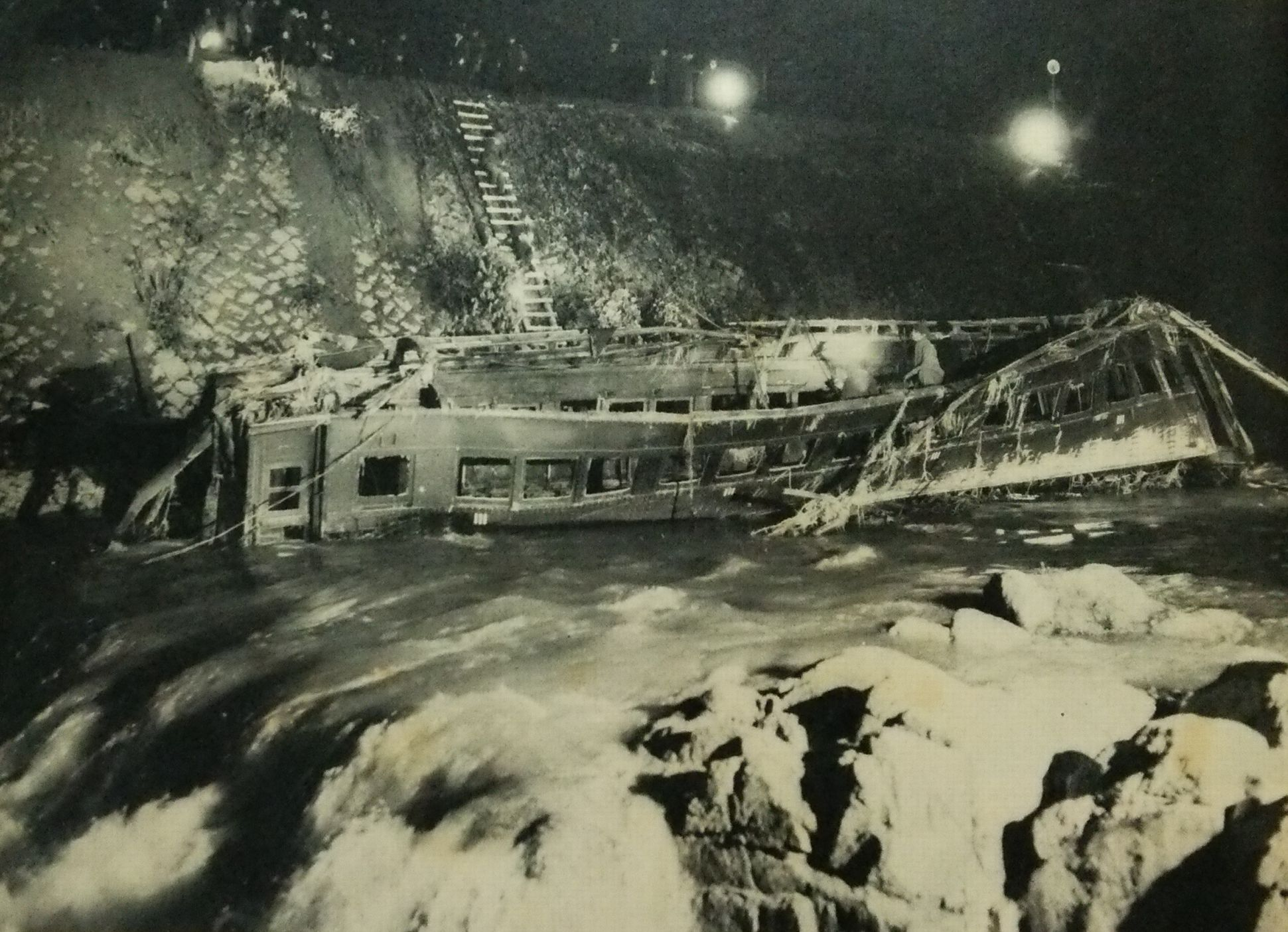
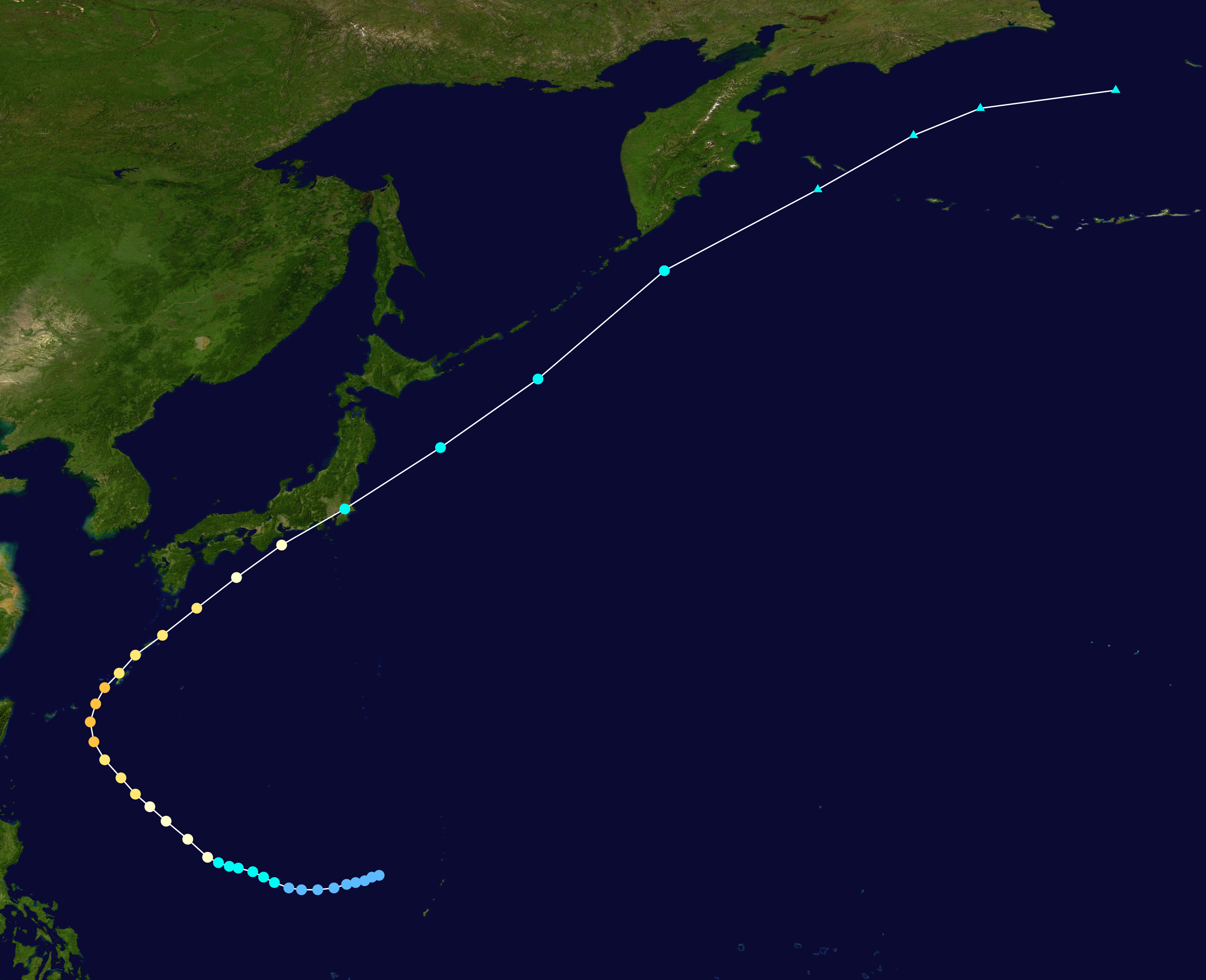
- Duration: September 19 – September 27
- Peak intensity: 205 km/h (125 mph) (1-min); 955 hPa (mbar)

Harriet formed on September 19. It was a moderately powerful typhoon that brought heavy and 110 mph winds to Japan. The typhoon destroyed 600 buildings and killed 38 people. Harriet then crossed the Sea of Japan before making the second landfall in South Korea. There, the storm brought heavy rains and gusty winds before dissipating on September 27. Harriet killed 53 people and left $50 million (1956) dollars in damage.

=== Typhoon Ivy ===
- Typhoon (JMA)
- Category 1 typhoon (SSHWS)
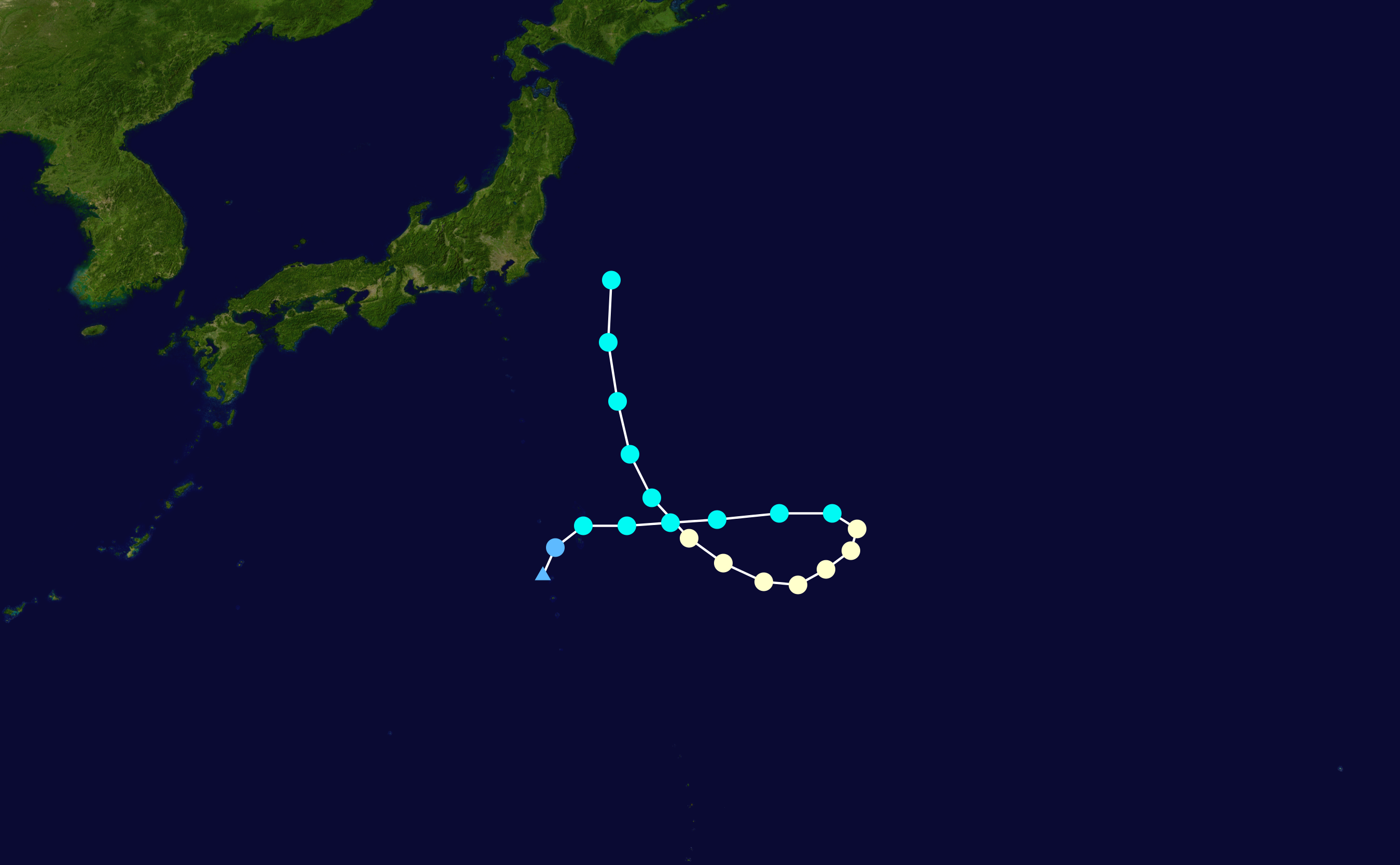
- Duration: September 22 – September 27
- Peak intensity: 130 km/h (80 mph) (1-min); 985 hPa (mbar)

Ivy was a category 1 typhoon at its peak intensity. It didn't affect land.

=== Super Typhoon Jean ===
- Typhoon (JMA)
- Category 4 super typhoon (SSHWS)
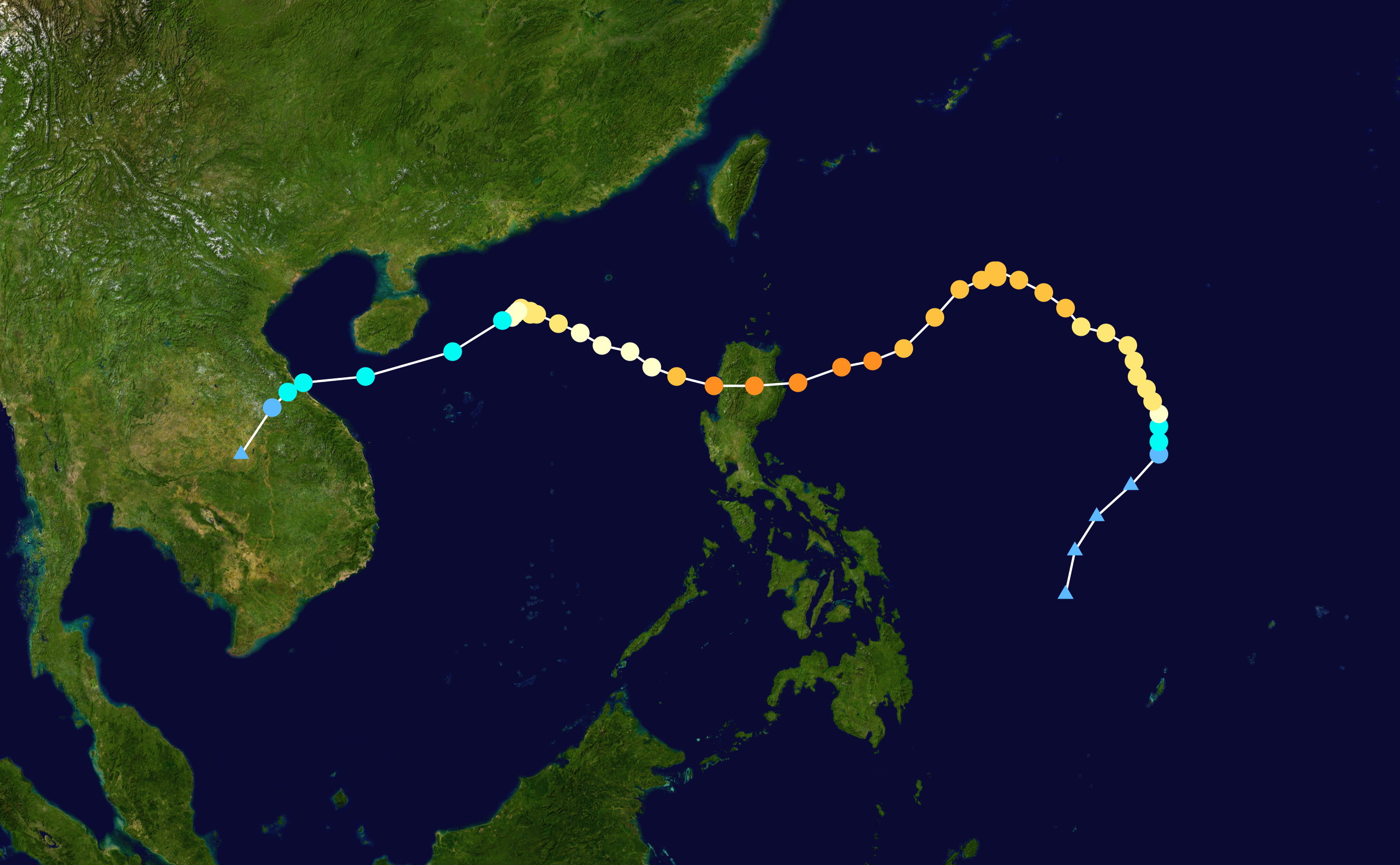
- Duration: October 14 – October 26
- Peak intensity: 250 km/h (155 mph) (1-min); 940 hPa (mbar)

Jean hit the Philippines as a Category 4 super typhoon.

=== Tropical Storm 18W ===
- Tropical depression (JMA)
- Tropical storm (SSHWS)
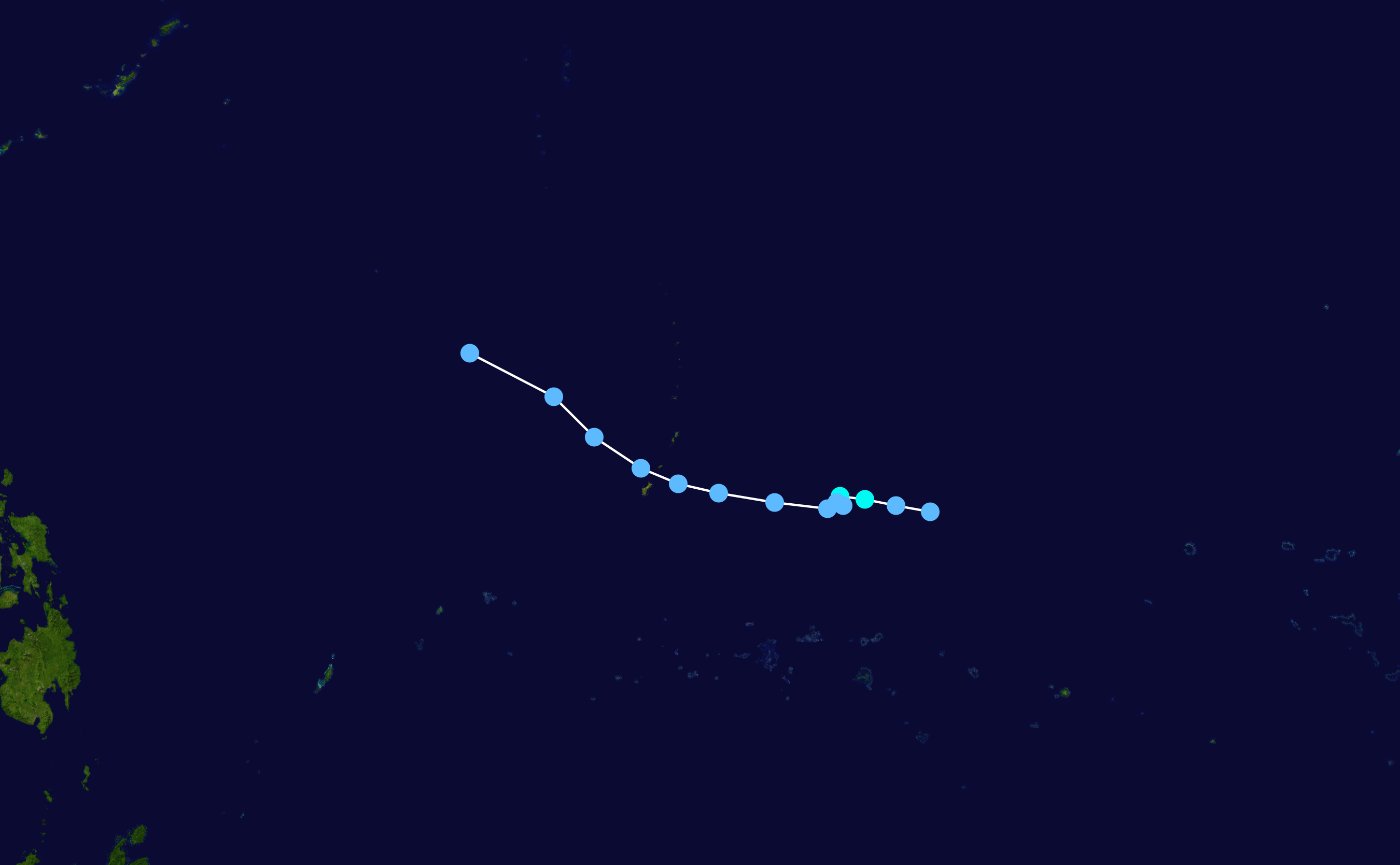
- Duration: October 16 – October 19
- Peak intensity: 75 km/h (45 mph) (1-min); 999 hPa (mbar)

18W was a weak tropical storm that stayed out at sea.

=== Typhoon Karen-Lucille ===
- Typhoon (JMA)
- Category 2 typhoon (SSHWS)
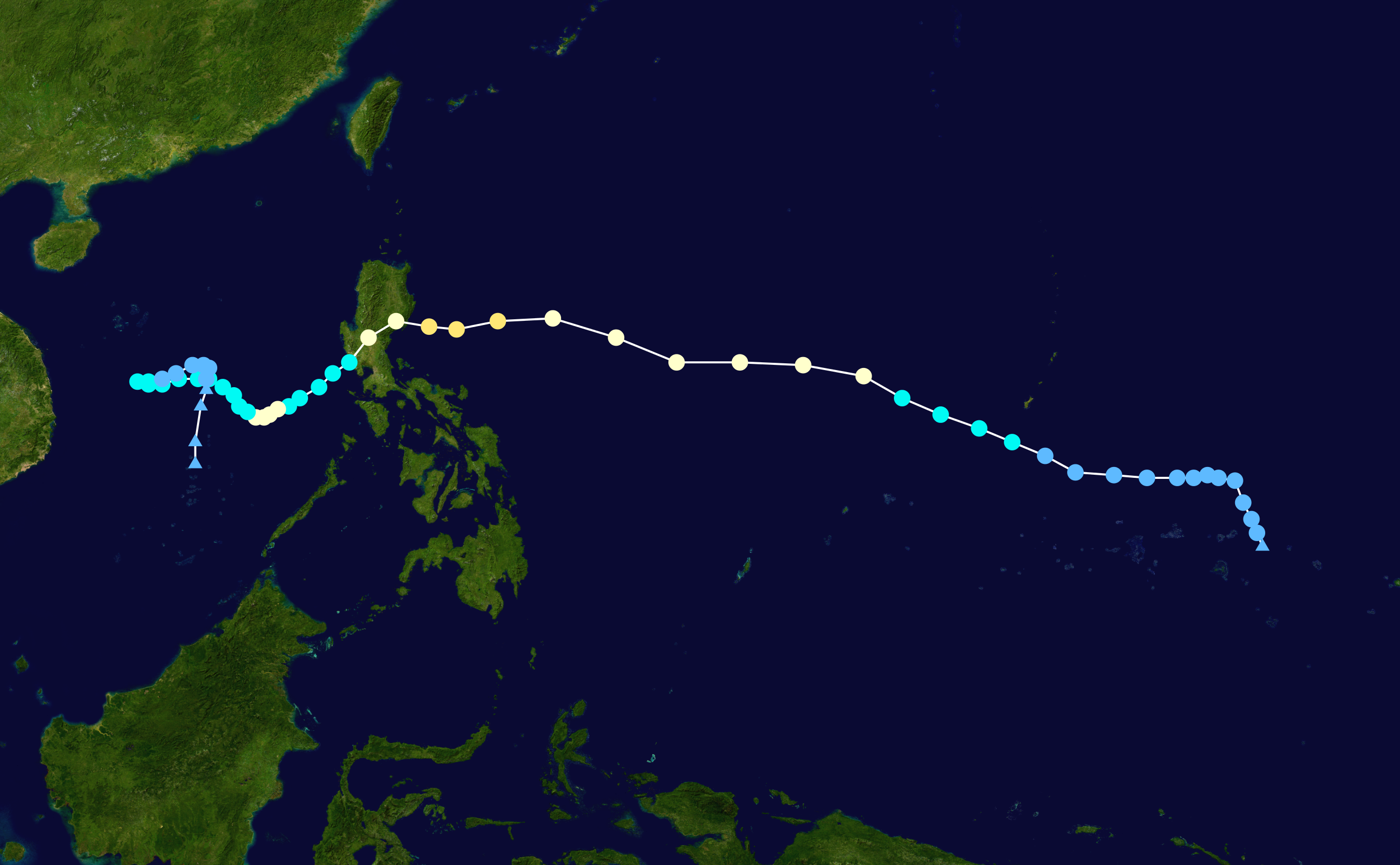
- Duration: November 9 – November 23
- Peak intensity: 175 km/h (110 mph) (1-min); 975 hPa (mbar)

The storm made landfall in the Philippines as a category 1 typhoon and dissipated in the South China Sea on November 23.

=== Tropical Storm Mary ===
- Typhoon (JMA)
- Tropical storm (SSHWS)
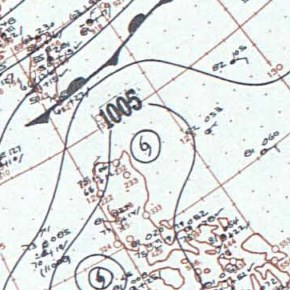
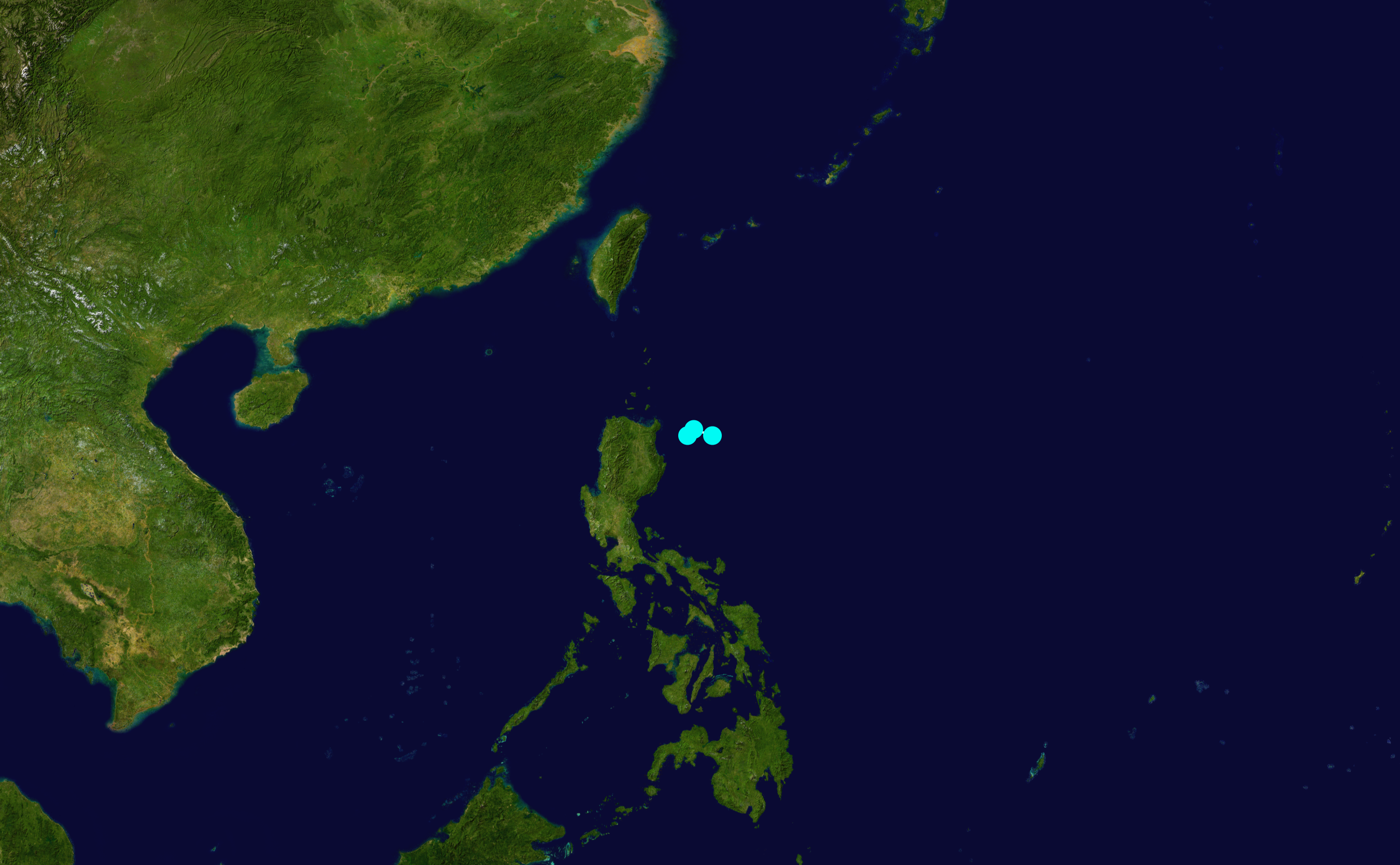
- Duration: November 16 – November 16
- Peak intensity: 95 km/h (60 mph) (1-min); 995 hPa (mbar)

Mary was a short-lived tropical storm that never impacted land.

=== Typhoon Nadine ===
- Typhoon (JMA)
- Category 1 typhoon (SSHWS)
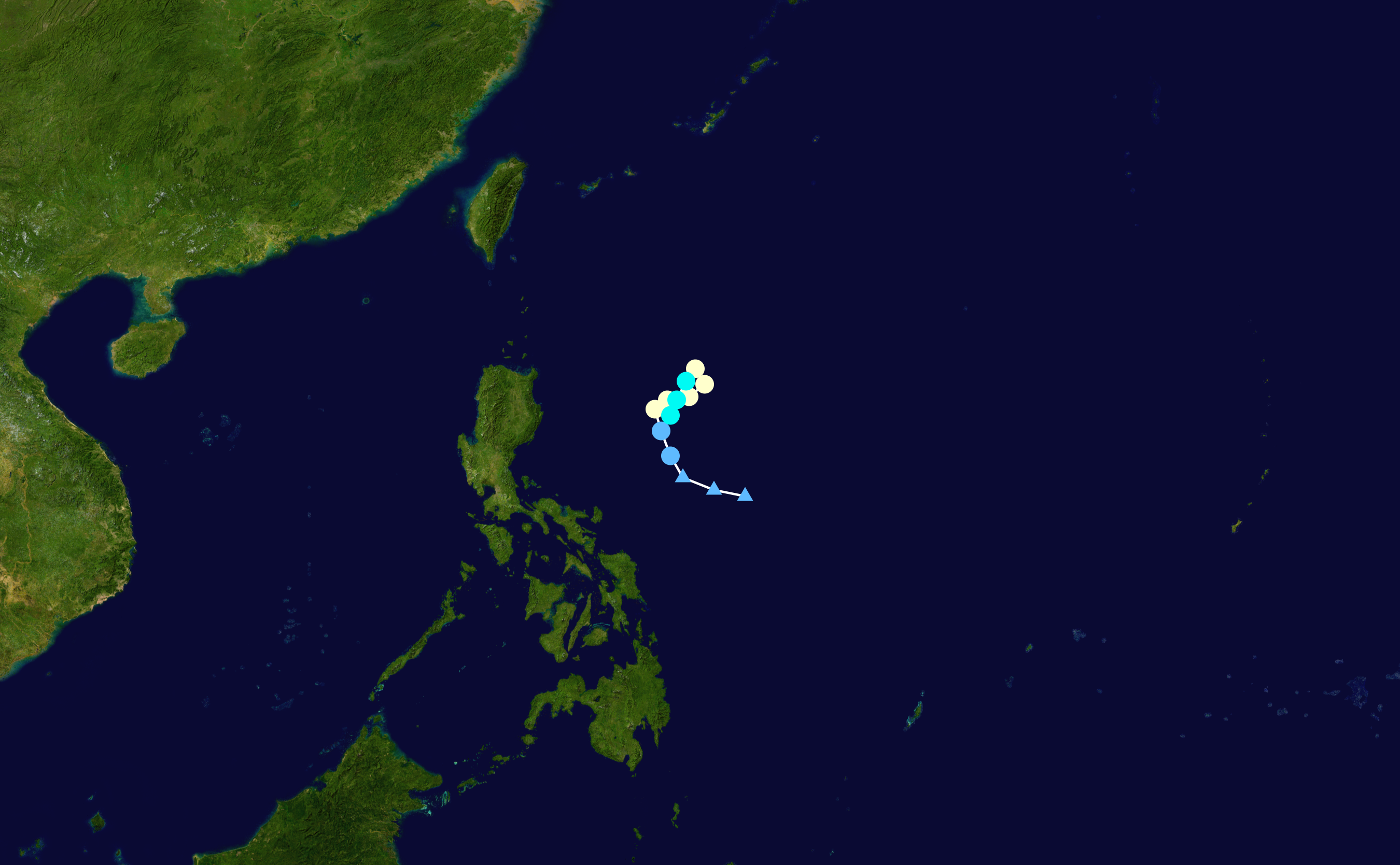
- Duration: November 22 – November 25
- Peak intensity: 140 km/h (85 mph) (1-min); 990 hPa (mbar)

Nadine was a typhoon that stalled and then weakened, Nadine never made landfall.

=== Typhoon Olive ===
- Typhoon (JMA)
- Category 1 typhoon (SSHWS)
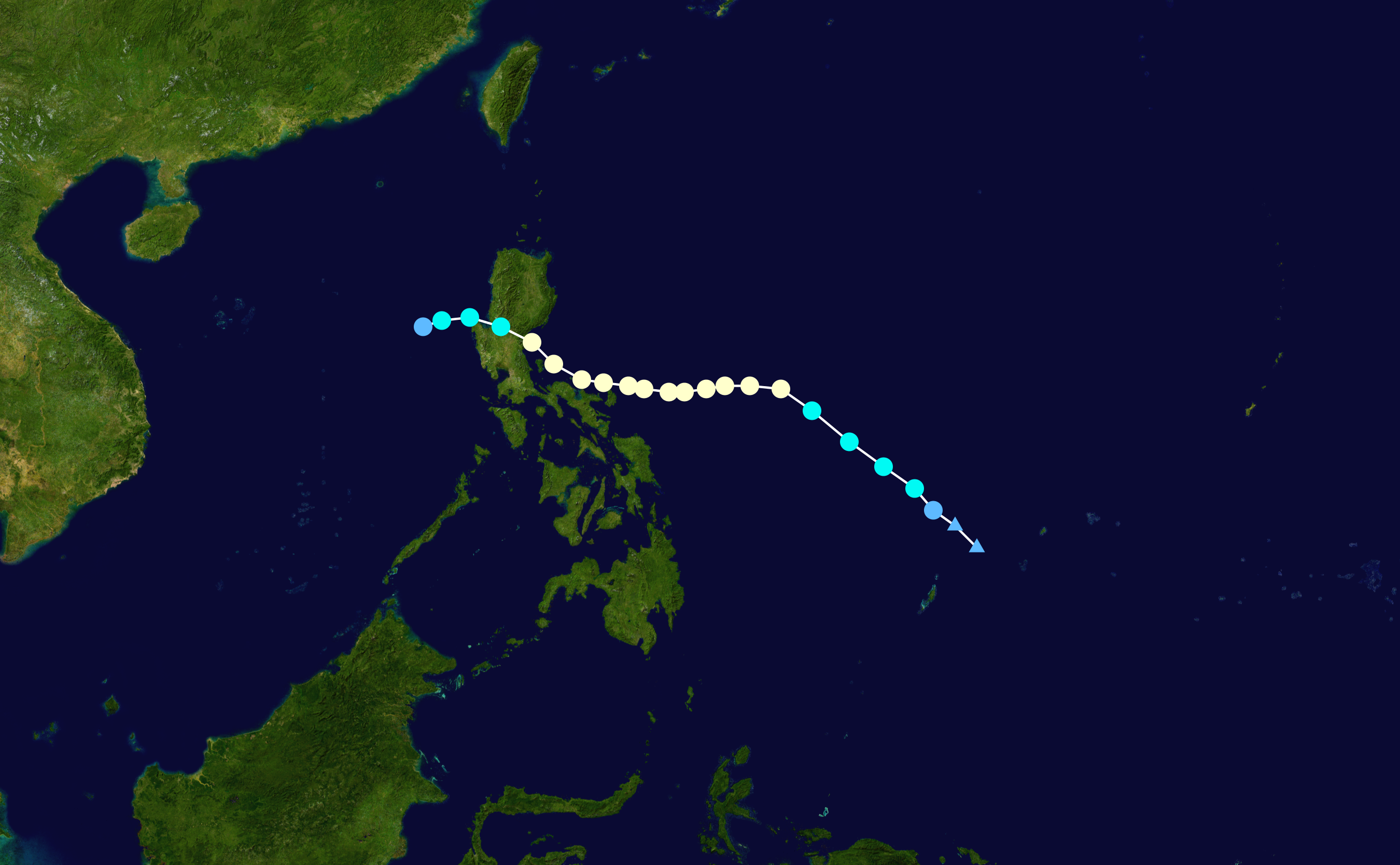
- Duration: November 24 – November 30
- Peak intensity: 140 km/h (85 mph) (1-min); 990 hPa (mbar)

Olive tracked across the Philippines as a hurricane.

=== Typhoon Polly ===
- Typhoon (JMA)
- Category 2 typhoon (SSHWS)
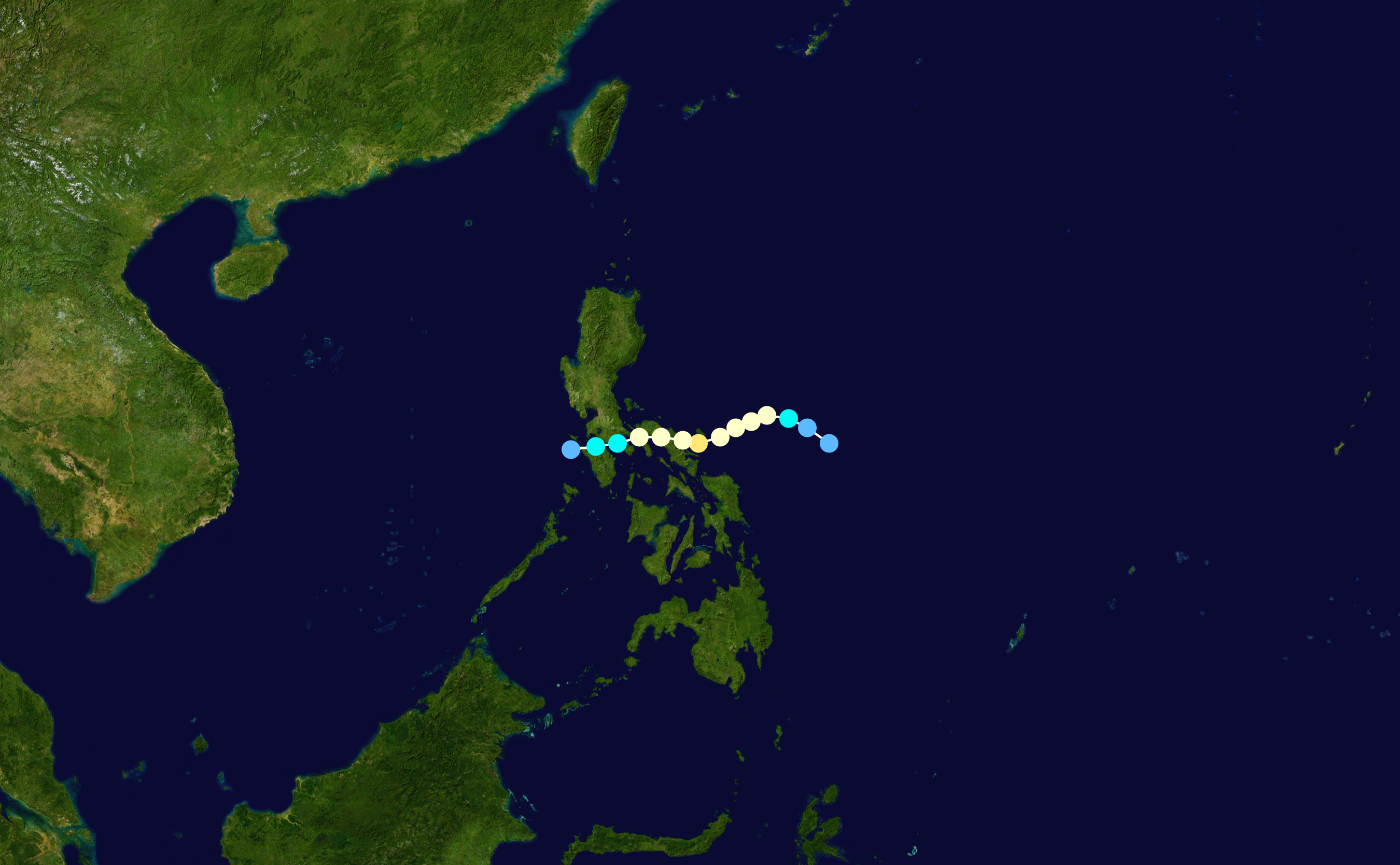
- Duration: December 7 – December 10
- Peak intensity: 165 km/h (105 mph) (1-min); 980 hPa (mbar)

The last storm of the season, Polly formed on December 7. It reached its peak intensity with 105 mph winds. It made landfall in Philippines as a category 2 typhoon and this made Polly to weaken to a tropical storm and dissipated. On Philippines, Polly brought 105 mph winds and 11 inch rains in the Philippines on December 8. The typhoon killed 79 people and left $2.5 million (1956 dollars) in damage.

== Storm names ==
These are the names used in 1956. This is the same used in the 1952 season, with the exception of Jean, Lucille and Nadine which replaced Jeanne, Lois and Nona.

- Sarah
- Thelma
- Vera
- Wanda
- Amy
- Babs
- Charlotte
- Dinah
- Emma
- Freda
- Gilda
- Harriet
- Ivy
- Jean
- Karen
- Lucille
- Mary
- Nadine
- Olive
- Polly

== See also ==
- List of Pacific typhoon seasons
- 1956 Atlantic hurricane season
- 1956 Pacific hurricane season
- Australian region cyclone seasons: 1955–56 1956–57
- South Pacific cyclone seasons: 1955–56 1956–57
- South-West Indian Ocean cyclone seasons: 1955–56 1956–57
