= Typhoon Charlotte (1959) =

Pacific typhoon in 1959

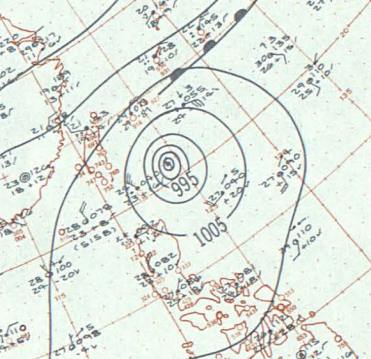
- Surface analysis of Typhoon Charlotte on October 14

Meteorological history
- Formed: October 9, 1959
- Extratropical: October 19, 1959
- Dissipated: October 20, 1959

Unknown-strength storm
- 10-minute sustained (JMA)
- Lowest pressure: 905 hPa (mbar); 26.72 inHg

Category 5-equivalent super typhoon
- 1-minute sustained (SSHWS/JTWC)
- Highest winds: 270 km/h (165 mph)
- Lowest pressure: 905 hPa (mbar); 26.72 inHg

Overall effects
- Fatalities: 46 confirmed
- Damage: $300,000 (1959 USD)
- Areas affected: Philippines • Japan (Okinawa) • Taiwan • Hawaii
- IBTrACS
- Part of the 1959 Pacific typhoon season

Typhoon Charlotte was a damaging typhoon that struck Okinawa during the 1959 Pacific typhoon season. An area of low pressure developed in early October, and it became a tropical depression on October 9. The depression strengthened to a tropical storm one day later, and it received the name Charlotte from the Joint Typhoon Warning Center (JTWC). The system strengthened quickly and became a typhoon eighteen hours later. Charlotte continued to rapidly strengthen to its peak of 260 km/h (160 mph) on October 13. The typhoon began to weaken afterwards, and it traveled south of Okinawa on October 16. The typhoon weakened to a tropical storm on October 19 as it began its extratropical transition. The storm became extratropical later that day, and the Japan Meteorological Agency (JMA) ceased tracking the system on October 20.

During October 16 and 17, Charlotte caused heavy damage to the Okinawa Islands. Large amounts of rainfall caused landslides across the islands and many rice and sugar cane crops were destroyed by floods. Multiple public buildings and 800 homes were damaged or destroyed, leaving over 1,000 people homeless. Damage done to military bases on the island amounted to $300,000 (equivalent to $3,313,356 in 2025). 46 people died during the storm in the islands. Minor damage was also reported in Philippines, Taiwan, and Japan, mostly due to flooding and strong winds.

== Meteorological history ==
Map plotting the storm's track and intensity, according to the Saffir–Simpson scale Map key Saffir–Simpson scale Tropical depression (≤38 mph, ≤62 km/h) Tropical storm (39–73 mph, 63–118 km/h) Category 1 (74–95 mph, 119–153 km/h) Category 2 (96–110 mph, 154–177 km/h) Category 3 (111–129 mph, 178–208 km/h) Category 4 (130–156 mph, 209–251 km/h) Category 5 (≥157 mph, ≥252 km/h) Unknown Storm type Tropical cyclone Subtropical cyclone Extratropical cyclone, remnant low, tropical disturbance, or monsoon depression

In early October, an area of low pressure developed near the Intertropical Convergence Zone near Palau. The low pressure intensified and contracted by October 8, and a closed circulation was found later that day by a reconnaissance aircraft. Both Japan Meteorological Agency (JMA) and Joint Typhoon Warning Center (JTWC) began tracking the system as a tropical depression on October 9, (Note: The Japan Meteorological Agency is the official Regional Specialized Meteorological Center for the western Pacific Ocean.) with winds of 50 km/h (30 mph), and a surface pressure of 1,008 hectopascals (29.8 inHg). JTWC upgraded the depression to a tropical storm one day later, and it was given the name Charlotte by the warning center. The system intensified steadily and traveled northwestward at 6–9 knots (11–17 km/h). JMA upgraded the system to a tropical storm at 1200 UTC, when the JTWC assessed it at 110 km/h (70 mph). JTWC upgraded Charlotte to a typhoon six hours later, with winds of 150 km/h (95 mph). The typhoon continued to rapidly intensify, reaching 200 km/h (125 mph) by October 12. Charlotte began to travel around the North Pacific High, decreasing in speed east of Luzon. The storm reached peak strength at 1200 UTC on October 13, with winds of 265 km/h (165 mph) and a pressure of 905 hPa (26.7 inHg) recorded by a reconnaissance aircraft.

Charlotte weakened slightly to 260 km/h (160 mph) six hours after peak strength. The typhoon's movement soon slowed down to 3–4 knots (5.6–7.4 km/h), and began its turn northeastward near Taiwan. It continued to gradually weaken as it traveled toward to Ryukyu Islands. Charlotte was located 64 kilometers (40 mi) south of Okinawa at 1200 UTC on October 16, with winds of 165 km/h (105 mph). Colder air temperatures caused more weakening on October 18, and westerlies caused the storm to accelerate to the northeast. A secondary upper level center north of Charlotte was found by a reconnaissance aircraft, which used it for fixes during that day. By 1800 UTC, the typhoon had weakened to a tropical storm south of Honshu, with winds of 110 km/h (70 mph). On October 19, JTWC issued the last warning on the system, and JMA declared the storm extratropical six hours later. The cyclone was embedded in the polar front hours later, and JTWC ceased tracking the system after it weakened past tropical storm strength at 55 km/h (35 mph) at 1800 UTC. JMA continued to track the cyclone until 0600 UTC of October 20.

== Preparations and impact ==
On October 15, preparations were made by the United States Marine Corps stationed in Okinawa. Marines, including the ones in the 3rd division at Camp Sukiran and Camp Schwab, were moved to storm shelters from their tents and Quonset huts. Only security guards in tanks and amphibious tractors remained outside of the shelters. On October 17, twelve freighters sought shelter in the harbor at Kagoshima, and seventy small craft moved to other protected areas within Japan.

In northern Luzon and the Batanes of the Philippines, heavy rain and strong winds were reported. Similar conditions happened in Taiwan, where little damage happened. In Tokyo, 72 km/h (45 mph) winds were reported, and several streets and 31 homes were flooded. A large fleet of British ships, led by HMS Alert, arrived at Yokohama after being delayed by typhoons Charlotte and Dinah. The area of low pressure that absorbed Charlotte later caused an increase in surf in Hawaii.

Charlotte caused significant damage to Okinawa during October 16 and 17. Winds of 90–150 miles per hour (140–240 km/h) and rainfall of 24 inches (61 cm) were reported on the island, This resulted in landslides, exacerbated by deforestation, to happen across northern Okinawa. The landslide in Ōgimi killed seven people and injured four, and eighteen people were killed and four were injured when thirty feet (9.1 m) of debris buried their houses in Tagazako. Three people were killed and three were injured in Taiho. In Tsuda, nine people were killed and five people were injured. 70 percent of the rice crops and 16 percent of the sugar cane and others in the territory were destroyed. Flooding occurred at Naha, where some parts of the city were flooded under five feet (1.5 m) of water. Twenty American families were evacuated from a low-lying area to a schoolhouse in Awase. Electricity, telephone, and utilities were down after the storm, and were restored one day later. Highways, 11 public buildings, and military installations were also severely damaged. 275 homes were destroyed, and 618 homes were damaged, leaving 1,038 people homeless. The total cost for the damage of the military installations was $300,000 (equivalent to $3,313,356 in 2025). The official total casualty count was 46 people killed and 24 injured, with no American casualties. Lieutenant General Donald Prentice Booth issued a statement of condolence to the Okinawan families after the storm.

== See also ==
- Typhoon Billie (1959)
- Typhoon Sarah (1959)
- Typhoon Vera
- Other storms of the same name
