= List of storms named Carmen =

The name Carmen has been used for seventeen tropical cyclones and for three extratropical cyclones worldwide. Of the tropical systems, one was in the Atlantic Ocean, thirteen were in the Northwest Pacific Ocean, one was in the Southwest Indian Ocean, and two have been in the Australian region. The three extratropical systems have all been European windstorms.

In the Atlantic:

- Hurricane Carmen (1974), made landfall on the Yucatán Peninsula, then crossed the Gulf of Mexico and made a second landfall in southern Louisiana; killed 8 people and caused at least $162 million (USD) in damage

In the Northwest Pacific:

- Tropical Storm Carmen (1949) (01W)
- Tropical Storm Carmen (1952) (23W)
- Typhoon Carmen (1957) (11W), made landfall in southern China
- Typhoon Carmen (1960) (31W), made landfall in South Korea; 24 casualties and $2 million in damage (1960 USD)
- Typhoon Carmen (1963) (23W, Luding)
- Typhoon Carmen (1965) (35W, Anding), Category 5 super typhoon (ja)
- Typhoon Carmen (1968) (19W)
- Tropical Storm Carmen (1971) (T7129, 31W) - hit Japan (ja)
- Typhoon Carmen (1974) (Tering, 28W), hit Luzon just days after Typhoon Bess (Susang); second landfall on southeastern China; 25 fatalities, with damage estimated at $13 million (1974 USD)
- Typhoon Carmen (1978) (12W, Miding)
- Tropical Storm Carmen (1980) (01W), formed in the Central Pacific
- Tropical Storm Carmen (1983) (06W, Etang), formed off the coast of Vietnam and moved toward the Luzon Strait; eventually absorbed into Typhoon Abby (Diding)
- Typhoon Carmen (1986) (15W), passed between Rota and Saipan

In the Southwest Indian:

- Cyclone Carmen (1968) (06S)

In the Australian region:

- Cyclone Carmen (1964) (25P)
- Cyclone Carmen (1971) (03S)

In Europe:

- Cyclone Carmen (2010)
- St. Jude storm (2013), named Carmen by the European Windstorm Centre
- Storm Carmen (2017)
