= Hurricane Carmen =

Category 4 Atlantic hurricane in 1974

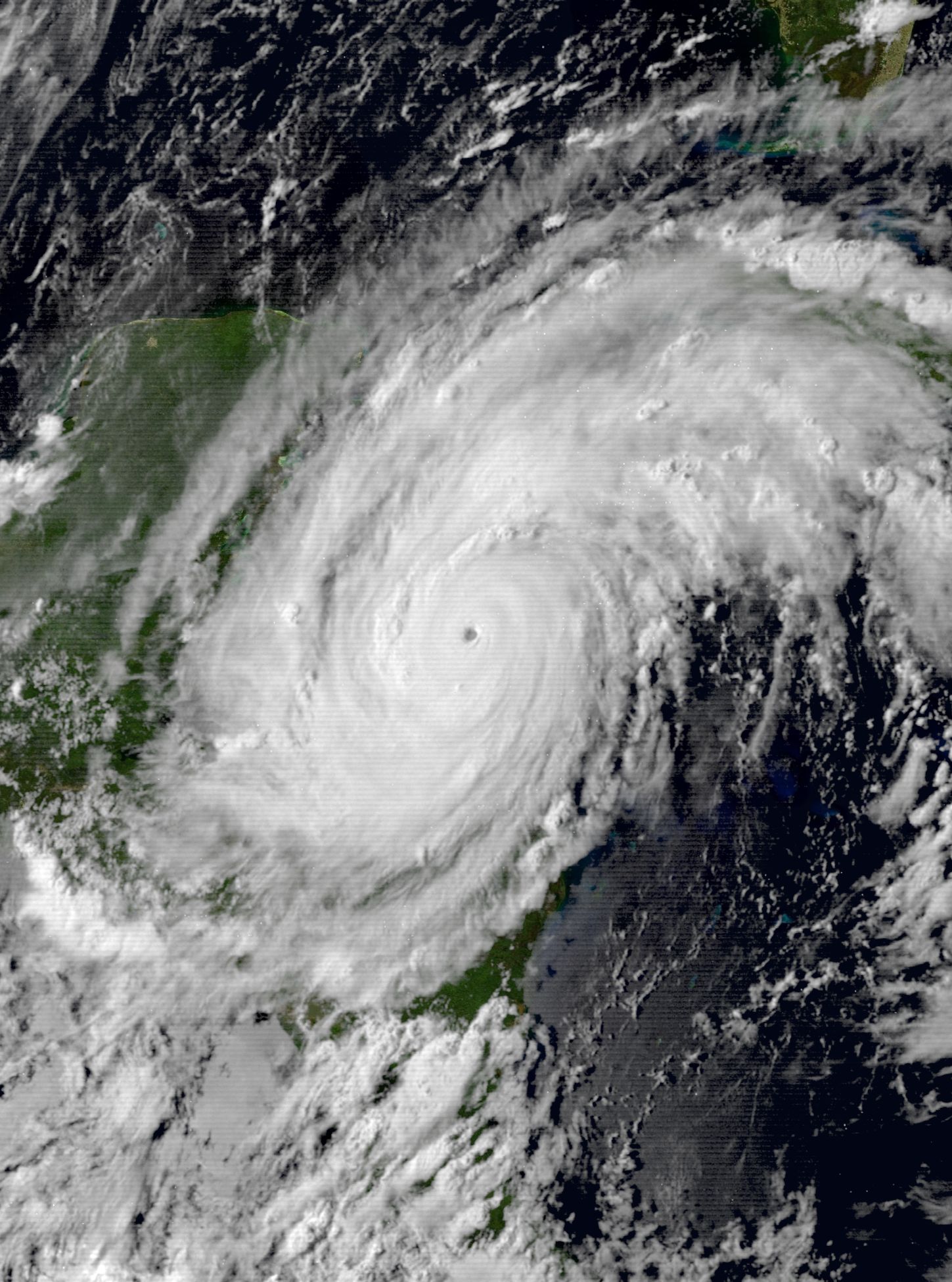
- Carmen at peak intensity near the Yucatán Peninsula on September 1

Meteorological history
- Formed: August 29, 1974
- Dissipated: September 10, 1974

Category 4 major hurricane
- 1-minute sustained (SSHWS/NWS)
- Highest winds: 155 mph (250 km/h)
- Lowest pressure: 928 mbar (hPa); 27.40 inHg

Overall effects
- Fatalities: 8
- Damage: $162 million (1974 USD)
- Areas affected: Lesser Antilles, Puerto Rico, Hispaniola, Jamaica, Yucatán Peninsula, Belize, Louisiana, Texas
- IBTrACS
- Part of the 1974 Atlantic hurricane season

Hurricane Carmen was the most intense tropical cyclone of the 1974 Atlantic hurricane season. A destructive storm with widespread impacts, Carmen developed from a tropical wave that emerged from Africa toward the end of August. The disturbance traveled westward, and organized as a tropical depression east of the Lesser Antilles on August 29. The storm moved through the Caribbean Sea, and in an environment conducive to intensification, it quickly strengthened to its initial peak intensity as a Category 4 hurricane on the Saffir–Simpson Hurricane Scale. Carmen moved ashore on the Yucatán Peninsula, where, despite striking a sparsely populated region, it caused significant crop damage and killed several people. Before the storm's arrival, officials had set up several evacuation centers, and many residents had moved to higher ground.

Upon entering the Gulf of Mexico, Carmen turned northward and re-intensified as it approached the United States. Initially threatening the major city of New Orleans, it veered westward and made landfall on the marshland of southern Louisiana, eventually dissipating over eastern Texas on September 10. Tropical cyclone watches and warnings had been issued for the storm, and approximately 100,000 residents left their homes and sought shelter. Damage was lighter than first feared, but the sugar industry suffered substantial losses. Throughout its course, the hurricane killed 8 people and caused $162 million in damage. Due to the severity of the storm, the name Carmen was retired from the list of Atlantic tropical cyclone names.

== Meteorological history ==
Map plotting the storm's track and intensity, according to the Saffir–Simpson scale Map key Saffir–Simpson scale Tropical depression (≤38 mph, ≤62 km/h) Tropical storm (39–73 mph, 63–118 km/h) Category 1 (74–95 mph, 119–153 km/h) Category 2 (96–110 mph, 154–177 km/h) Category 3 (111–129 mph, 178–208 km/h) Category 4 (130–156 mph, 209–251 km/h) Category 5 (≥157 mph, ≥252 km/h) Unknown Storm type Tropical cyclone Subtropical cyclone Extratropical cyclone, remnant low, tropical disturbance, or monsoon depression

The origins of Hurricane Carmen can be traced to a weather disturbance over Africa during the middle of August 1974. The disturbance moved slowly westward with little convective activity initially, although upon entering the Atlantic Ocean, it spawned a tropical wave within the Intertropical Convergence Zone. The wave had intensified and broadened by August 25, and it eventually split into two components, the northernmost of which consolidated into an organized storm system. Moving westward, the system developed into a tropical depression on August 29, more than 200 mi (320 km) east of Guadeloupe. Due to favorable outflow from an anticyclone nearby, the depression gradually strengthened as it moved through the Lesser Antilles. It attained tropical storm status on August 30, south of Puerto Rico, and was named Carmen by the National Hurricane Center. At first, the storm's proximity to Hispaniola prevented further strengthening, but by August 31, it had managed to intensify into a Category 1 hurricane on the Saffir–Simpson Hurricane Scale. As Carmen passed south of Jamaica, an eye feature briefly appeared.

On September 1, the hurricane began to rapidly deepen over warm waters of the Caribbean Sea; by 18:00 Coordinated Universal Time (UTC), it had strengthened to Category 4 intensity. Continuing westward, the storm passed north of Swan Island later that day. Early on September 2, a double eyewall appeared on satellite imagery. Carmen's forward movement gradually slowed as the storm took a west by north direction, and it reached its peak intensity with maximum sustained winds of 155 mph (250 km/h), accompanied by a central barometric pressure of 928 mbar (hPa; 27.4 inHg); in its hurricane reanalysis project, the NHC stated that Carmen may have peaked as a Category 5 hours earlier, although considerable uncertainties in Carmen's peak intensity prevented such an upgrade. Atmospheric steering currents became increasingly weaker, and Carmen slowed to a drift. Later on September 2, the hurricane made landfall on the Yucatán Peninsula; its northern jog spared Belize City from a direct hit. The storm's center passed a few miles north of Chetumal, Quintana Roo.

The cyclone drifted inland, deteriorating to a tropical storm on September 3. About a day later, Carmen emerged into the Gulf of Mexico, where it nearly stalled. Turning northward, the storm regained hurricane strength on September 5. Carmen continued to strengthen and accelerated northward towards the United States Gulf Coast, reaching a forward speed of 12 mph (19 km/h); at 00:00 UTC on September 7, it once again became a Category 3 major hurricane. The storm then became a Category 4 hurricane again and reached its second peak intensity while located south of Louisiana. Carmen weakened and veered westward before landfall, ultimately striking south-central Louisiana. After moving ashore, the hurricane quickly lost strength and late on September 9 degenerated into a tropical depression. The depression moved westward and soon dissipated over eastern Texas.

== Preparations ==
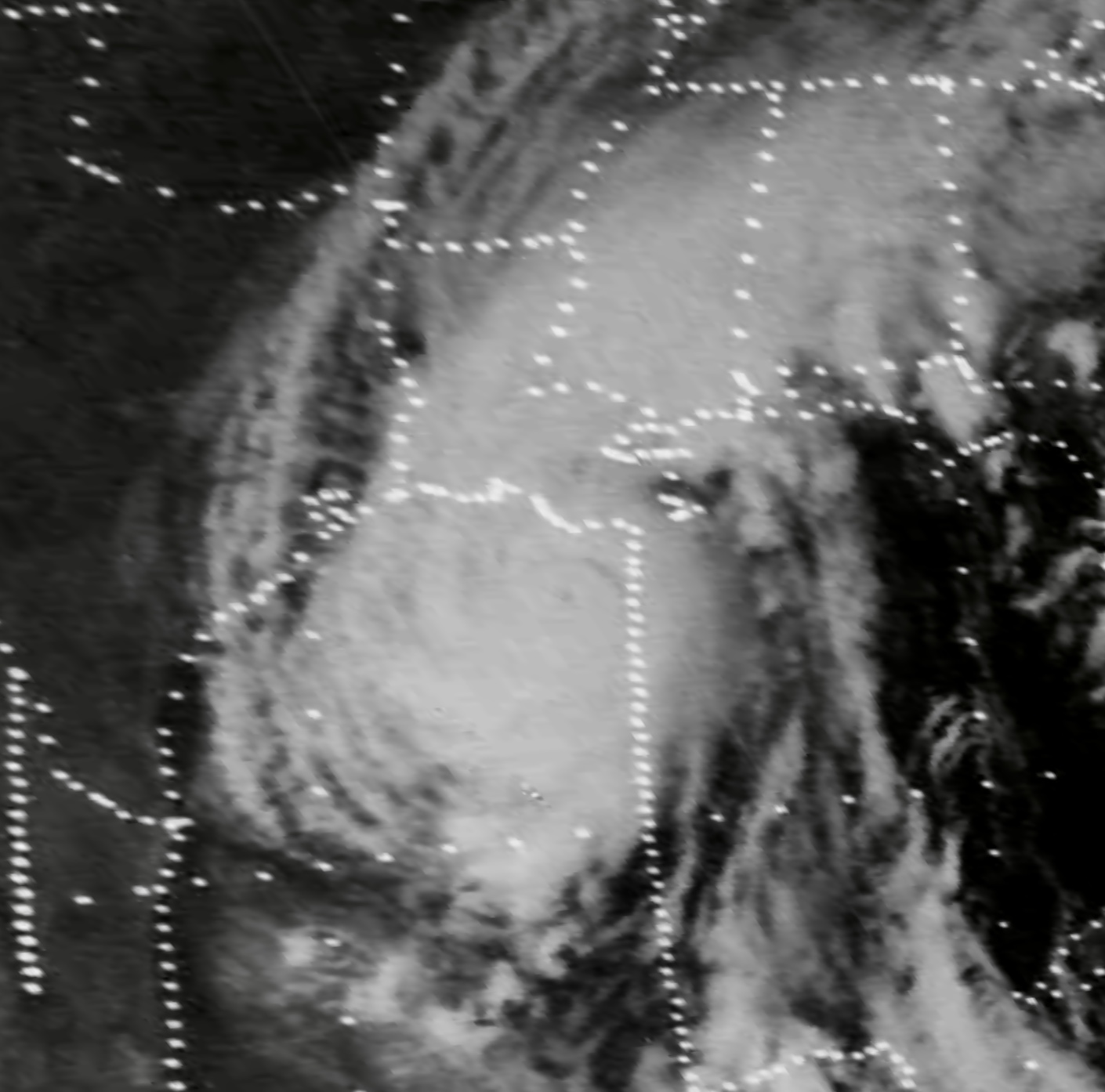
Hurricane Carmen in the Gulf of Mexico near landfall in Louisiana

Initial reactions to the approaching hurricane in the Yucatán Peninsula were regarded as calm by the United States media. Mexican officials declared an emergency alert by September 2, although they did not advise any evacuations. Meteorologists in the United States urged those living near the coast to move inland immediately. Fearing significant loss of life and property, the Red Cross began preparations for the approaching hurricane in Belize. The following day, the Mexican Army rushed to set up emergency operation centers and shelters in five cities. Mobile communication units and relief teams were prepared for deployment following the storm's passage. Many of the nearly 35,000 residents in and around the city of Chetumal evacuated to higher ground.

Although it initially threatened the United States city of New Orleans, the hurricane turned west prior to making landfall and spared the area from severe damage. Contrary to its actual path, forecasters predicted the hurricane to execute an eastward swerve toward Florida. Had the cyclone instead continued northward and traveled over Lake Pontchartrain, low-lying areas could have suffered "catastrophic" flooding. Over 100,000 residents of the Gulf Coast, mostly in Louisiana and Mississippi, evacuated in advance of the hurricane, causing heavy congestion on highways. About 60,000 people sought shelter in facilities across the New Orleans region, according to Red Cross officials.

Hurricane warnings were issued along the coast, while Coast Guard personnel went door-to-door on Grand Isle urging residents to leave the area. From there through the coast of southwestern Florida, small craft were advised to remain near shore due to rough seas. Offshore, workers were removed from oil rigs. Many Mississippi citizens, having experienced the destruction of Hurricane Camille just five years earlier, quickly left their coastal homes.

== Impact ==
As a tropical depression and storm, Carmen produced moderate rainfall across Puerto Rico and the northern Lesser Antilles, peaking at 5.91 in (150 mm) in Jájome Alto, Cayey, Puerto Rico. The storm spawned a tornado on Puerto Rico and triggered flash flooding, which collectively left over $2 million in damage. Winds approaching gale force affected several islands. Heavy rain fell on Hispaniola as the storm progressed westward, and on Jamaica, the storm caused three drownings. High winds and heavy rainfall were reported there and in Cuba. The hurricane damaged local reefs on the north shore of Jamaica during its passage. In Louisiana, Carmen caused about $150 million damage, much of it was in crop damage. Also, there were five storm-related deaths in Louisiana. Freshwater and tidal flooding occurred there, and, to a lesser degree, in the other Gulf Coast states.

On account of the hurricane's landfall intensities and the widespread damage it caused, the name Carmen was later retired from the rotating lists of Atlantic hurricane names. It will never again be used to name a tropical storm in the Atlantic basin.

=== Yucatán Peninsula ===
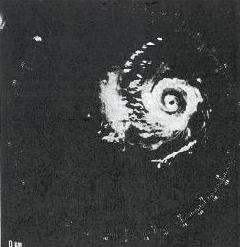
Radar image of Hurricane Carmen near landfall on September 2

Although Carmen made landfall as a powerful Category 4 hurricane, it caused significantly less damage than anticipated because it struck a sparsely populated region. However, torrential rainfall from the storm inundated farmland across the region, ruining rice crops. The fishing industry also sustained major losses. Communication with the hardest hit regions was lost following Carmen's passage; however, early reports stated that at least five people were injured. Several days later, officials in Mexico confirmed that three people had been killed by the storm. Sustained winds of 136 mph (217 km/h) were reported in the city of Chetumal, which was described as a "disaster". More than 5,000 people in the city lost their homes and belongings as a result of the storm. Officials in the area estimated that damage in Chetumal alone reached $8 million (1974 USD). Throughout the Yucatán Peninsula, Hurricane Carmen claimed four lives and wrought $10 million (1974 USD) in damage.

Following Carmen's passage, officials feared the worst for an area of 1,000 mi^{2} (2,590 km^{2}) where communication was lost in Belize. A reconnaissance task force was sent out from Belize City the day after Carmen made landfall to assist any residents stranded by the storm. One person was killed off the coast of Belize after being washed off his boat by large swells produced by Carmen. Three other fishermen were listed as missing following similar incidents. Thousands of people moved from coastal areas inland to escape the storm. Crop damage in the country was reportedly severe.

=== United States ===
Carmen dropped moderate rainfall along its path, though the heaviest rainfall occurred well to the east of the storm's center, in southern Alabama and the northern Florida Panhandle. Precipitation peaked at over 13 in (330 mm) in Atmore, Alabama. Winds gusted up to 86 mph (138 km/h), and along the coast, tides ran as high as 6 ft (1.8 m) above normal. Over northwestern Louisiana, winds ranged from 40 to 45 mph (64 to 72 km/h) and brought down several trees. In New Orleans, despite wind gusts to 72 mph (116 km/h), minimal damage was reported. The hurricane's effects in Baton Rouge were confined to strewn debris and a few downed trees. Because Carmen moved ashore over uninhabited marshland, it caused far less damage than initially feared. Nonetheless, tidal flooding from the Gulf of Mexico and coastal bodies of water was severe. Freshwater flooding was less extreme. In total, the storm inundated 2,380,500 acres (963,400 ha) of land in Louisiana, including 742,300 acres (300,400 ha) in Terrebonne Parish and 590,000 acres (240,000 ha) in Plaquemines Parish. A large oak tree was overturned by high winds in the town of Jeanerette in Iberia Parish.

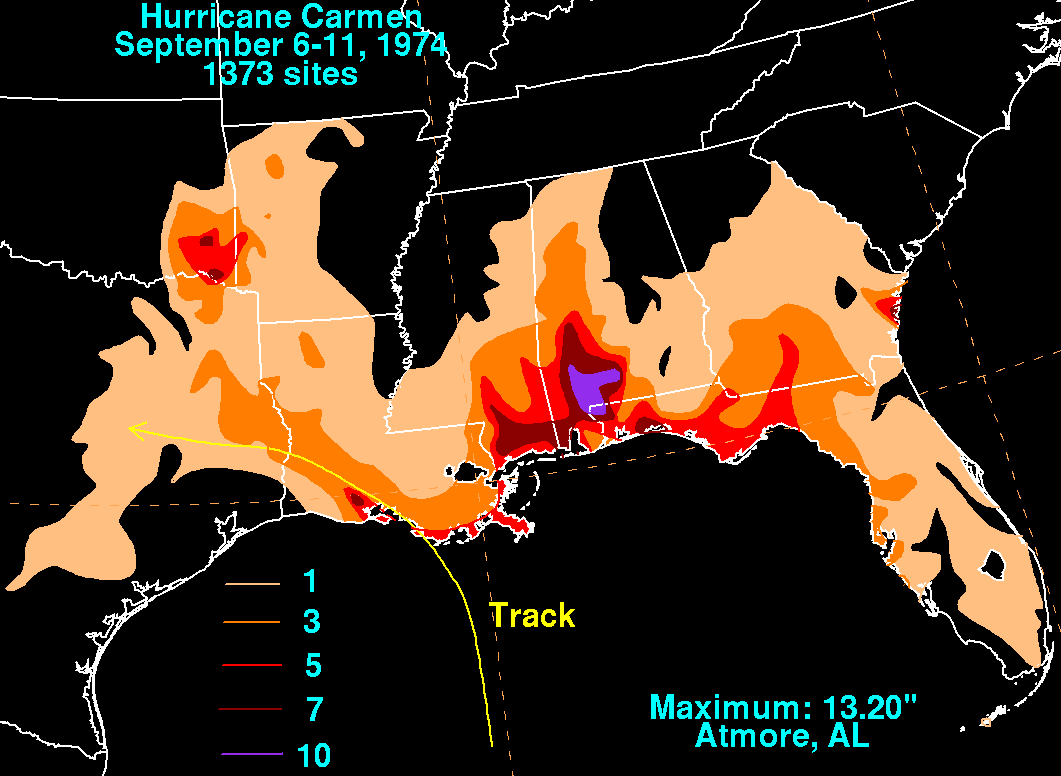
Rainfall map of the Gulf Coast

The storm's greatest impact was the loss of sugar cane crops in Louisiana. An estimated 308,000 acres (125,000 ha) of sugar cane in 16 parishes was damaged, and about 20 percent was completely ruined. After a tour of the affected area, then-Governor Edwin Edwards estimated crop damage alone at $400 million, although a more recent estimate placed total agricultural damage from the hurricane at $74 million. The sugar cane crop was crucial to the country's sugar supplies, rendering the losses "doubly bad", and sugar futures rose drastically after the storm. Other crops damaged by Carmen included soybeans, rice, and cotton.

Tidal action along the coast affected the balance of salinity in coastal marshes and water bodies. The sudden intrusion of saltwater stressed delicate plants. Fish, shrimp and oysters also suffered the ecological effects of Hurricane Carmen. Flooding on land caused some wildlife to drown. Several parks in Louisiana sustained damage, either from flooding or high winds; losses to Grand Island State Park in particular totaled $114,600. The oil and gas industry was also affected, and its estimated $24.7 million in losses resulted mainly from damage to equipment and offshore facilities. The storm diminished oil production by 1.4 million barrels when it shut down operations for 24 to 48 hours at various locations. Over 60,000 electric cooperative customers lost power.

The hurricane caused two fatalities in Louisiana: a utility repairman who was electrocuted while working on power lines damaged by strong winds, and a motorist who was involved in a storm-related traffic accident. Total monetary losses in the state was estimated at $150 million. Overall, the hurricane spawned four confirmed tornadoes. One touched down near Brandon, Mississippi, destroying a barn and causing other damage. Another struck Kaplan, Louisiana, injuring one person. The storm's effects in Mississippi were described as minimal and were mainly confined to minor traffic accidents during bouts of heavy precipitation. Light to moderate rainfall from the storm extended as far east as Florida and Georgia and as far west as Oklahoma and Texas.

== In popular culture ==
Hurricane Carmen was depicted in the 1994 movie Forrest Gump, in which the hurricane plays a major part in the movie's plot.

== See also ==
- Other storms of the same name
- List of Category 4 Atlantic hurricanes
- List of retired Atlantic hurricane names
- List of wettest tropical cyclones in Alabama
- Hurricane Audrey (1957) – caused severe impacts in Louisiana and Mississippi
- Hurricane Laura (2020) – devastated Southwestern Louisiana
- Hurricane Delta (2020) and Hurricane Zeta (2020) – both also made landfall on the Yucatán Peninsula and in Louisiana
