= Typhoon Carmen (1965) =

Pacific typhoon in 1965

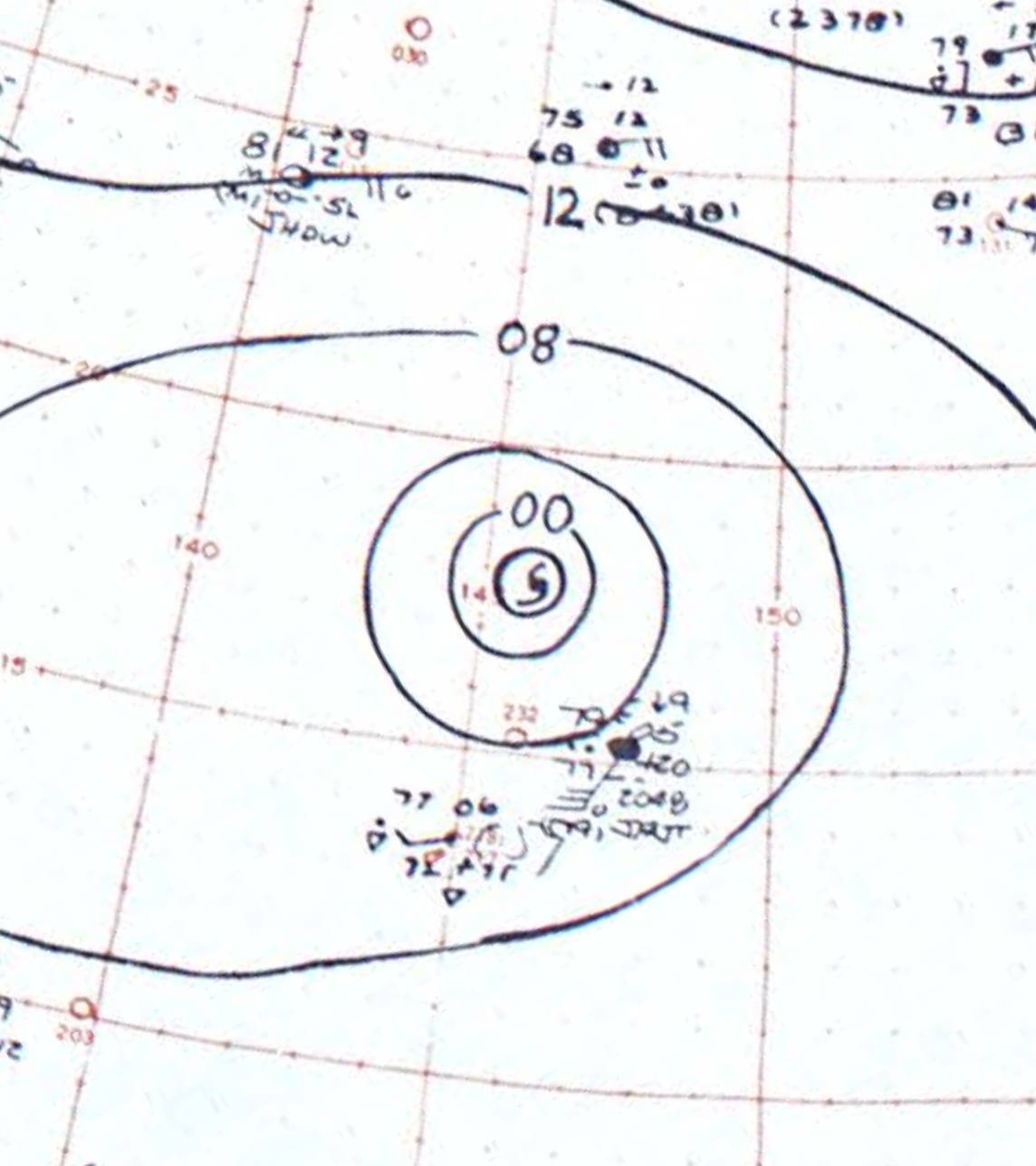
- Surface weather analysis of Typhoon Carmen on October 6

Meteorological history
- Formed: October 1, 1965
- Extratropical: October 9, 1965
- Dissipated: October 15, 1965

Typhoon
- 10-minute sustained (JMA)
- Lowest pressure: 914 hPa (mbar); 26.99 inHg

Category 5-equivalent super typhoon
- 1-minute sustained (SSHWS/JTWC)
- Highest winds: 280 km/h (175 mph)
- Lowest pressure: 916 hPa (mbar); 27.05 inHg

Overall effects
- Fatalities: 1
- Missing: 208
- Areas affected: Marshall Islands, Mariana Islands, Aleutian Islands
- IBTrACS
- Part of the 1965 Pacific typhoon season

Typhoon Carmen was a powerful tropical cyclone that was the ninth of eleven super typhoons to occur during the 1965 Pacific typhoon season. Originating as a tropical depression on October 1, the system tracked northwestward, before it had intensify into a tropical storm two days later. Carmen was later upgraded to a typhoon on October 3, before forming an eye while moving northward. Carmen underwent rapid intensification into a super typhoon in the vicinity of Agrihan on October 6, as its center passed above the island of Pagan, where powerful winds of 150 knots (280 km/h; 170 mph) from the storm were recorded. The storm held onto this intensity until it began weakening from cold air on October 9. Carmen quickly shifted northeastward, before transitioning into an extratropical cyclone on the same day. Carmen later dissipated over southeastern Alaska on October 15.

Carmen passed the Northern Mariana Islands, bringing powerful winds that destroyed buildings and crops in Agrihan. On October 7, seven Japanese fishing vessels capsized in the stormy seas. According to the Japan Coast Guard official confirmed report, 209 crewmen were killed.

== Meteorological history ==
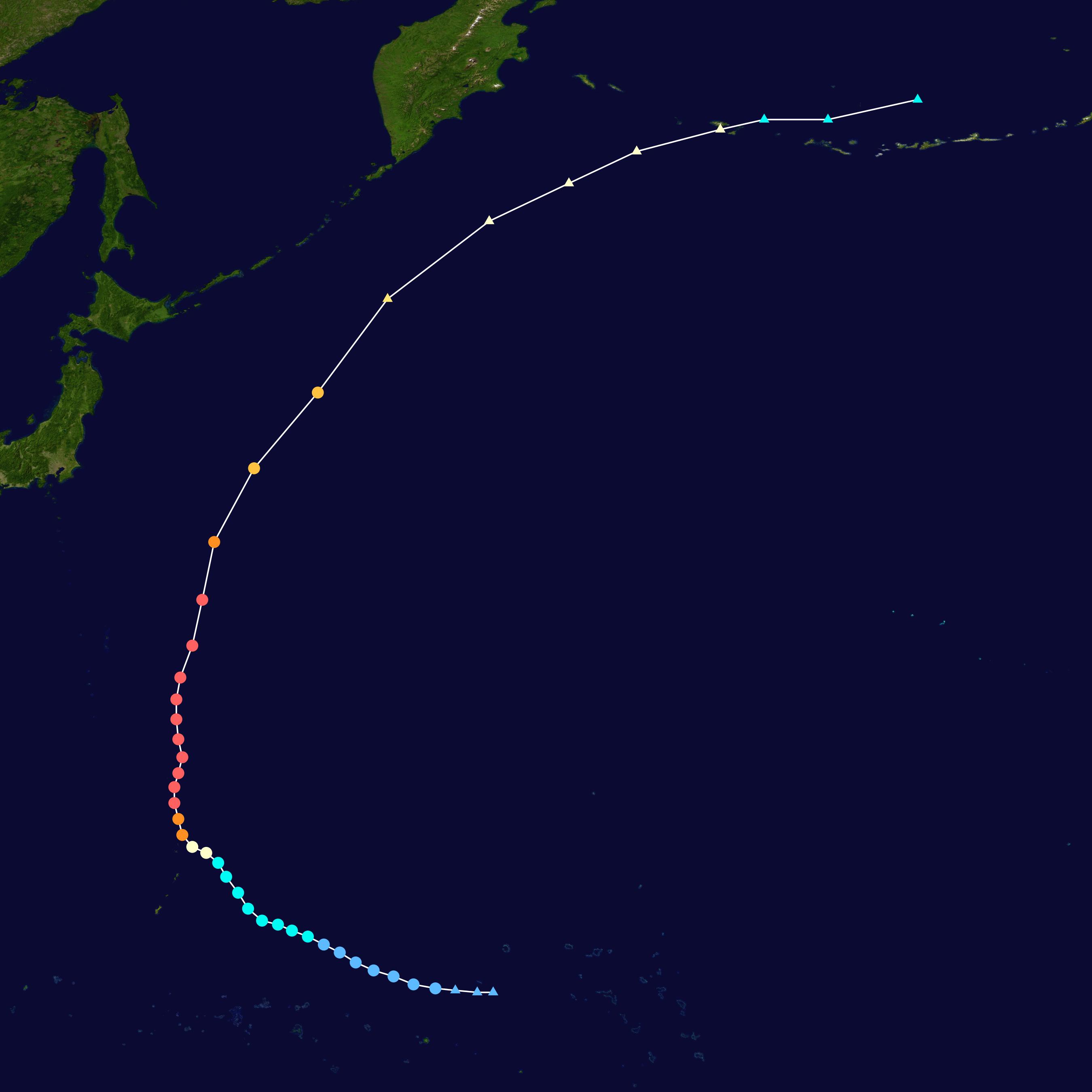
Map plotting the storm's track and intensity, according to the Saffir–Simpson scale Map key Saffir–Simpson scale Tropical depression (≤38 mph, ≤62 km/h) Tropical storm (39–73 mph, 63–118 km/h) Category 1 (74–95 mph, 119–153 km/h) Category 2 (96–110 mph, 154–177 km/h) Category 3 (111–129 mph, 178–208 km/h) Category 4 (130–156 mph, 209–251 km/h) Category 5 (≥157 mph, ≥252 km/h) Unknown Storm type Tropical cyclone Subtropical cyclone Extratropical cyclone, remnant low, tropical disturbance, or monsoon depression

The origins of Carmen can be traced to a surge in northeasterly trade winds. These clashes led to the development of a vortex on September 30, before it was discovered that it had intensified into tropical depression on October 1. The system moved northwestward, being about 190 kilometres (120 mi) south-southwest of Eniwetok Atoll. Carmen was soon upgraded to a tropical storm on October 3. While positioned under an anticyclone, Carmen consolidated into typhoon intensity late on October 5. An eye measuring 16 kilometres (10 mi) in diameter was detected by weather radar the same day, before Carmen then steered into a northward direction. On October 6, its eye passed above Pagan in the Mariana Islands, where maximum sustained winds were measured at 150 knots (280 km/h; 170 mph) by the Joint Typhoon Warning Center, equivalent to a Category 5 hurricane. Carmen's atmospheric pressure in the center was dropped to its lowest 914 hPa (26.99 inHg) at 18:00 UTC, according to the Japan Meteorological Agency. The rainbands tightened around the center, extending to 40 kilometres (25 mi), and were present in all quadrants of the storm.

Throughout its course, Carmen maintained its peak wind strength until October 9, when cold air began invading the circulation of the storm, while passing about 800 kilometres (500 mi) east of Tokyo. By 08:50 UTC, its eye was poorly defined. The storm rapidly shifted northeastward, accelerating 40 knots (74 km/h; 46 mph); during this movement, Carmen's started possessing characteristics of an extratropical cyclone. Carmen's wind speed would continue to decrease for the rest of its life span. On October 11, Carmen passed over the Aleutian Islands, prior to entering the Gulf of Alaska the following day. The system slowly drifted eastward, before dissipating over southeastern Alaska on October 15.

== Impact ==
Prior to Carmen's arrival, 25 B-52s evacuated from Guam to Naha, Okinawa, due to the storm's approach to the island. Carmen brushed the islands of Alamagan, Agrihan, and Pagan of the Northern Mariana Islands on October 6. In Pagan, Carmen's peak wind speed were recorded, while in Agrihan, all of the houses were destroyed, along with schools, dispensaries, and other buildings. Subsistence crops were also destroyed, with coconut palms battered. Due to the damage, Agrihan lost its capability to support its inhabitants, prompting the residents to evacuate to Saipan. After the effects, a rehabilitation task force was initiated on Pagan to supply aid, with rebuilding the airstrip being one of its top priorities. Although there were initially no funds for the project, the District Legislature later provided $7,000 to the District Administration, allowing the operation to commence.

Also in Agrihan, seven fishing boats sought shelter to southwest of the island, expecting that Carmen would pass east of the island. However, the storm's center passed the east coast of Agrihan, bringing severe storms at sea with an atmospheric pressure of 940 hPa (27.76 inHg) and winds of 70 metres per second (250 km/h; 160 mph). The ships attempted to evade at full speed, but each ship was soon capsized. In total, about 1,290 tons of gross tonnage was lost, and 208 were reported missing, while one was killed. Throughout the events, there were only two survivors from the ships. A rescue search was conducted, rescuing three ships that had moved ashore along with 39 who landed on the island.

== See also ==
- Other storms named Carmen
- Typhoon Olive (1952)
- Typhoon Faxai (2001)
- Typhoon Kong-rey (2007)
