= 1970–71 Australian region cyclone season =

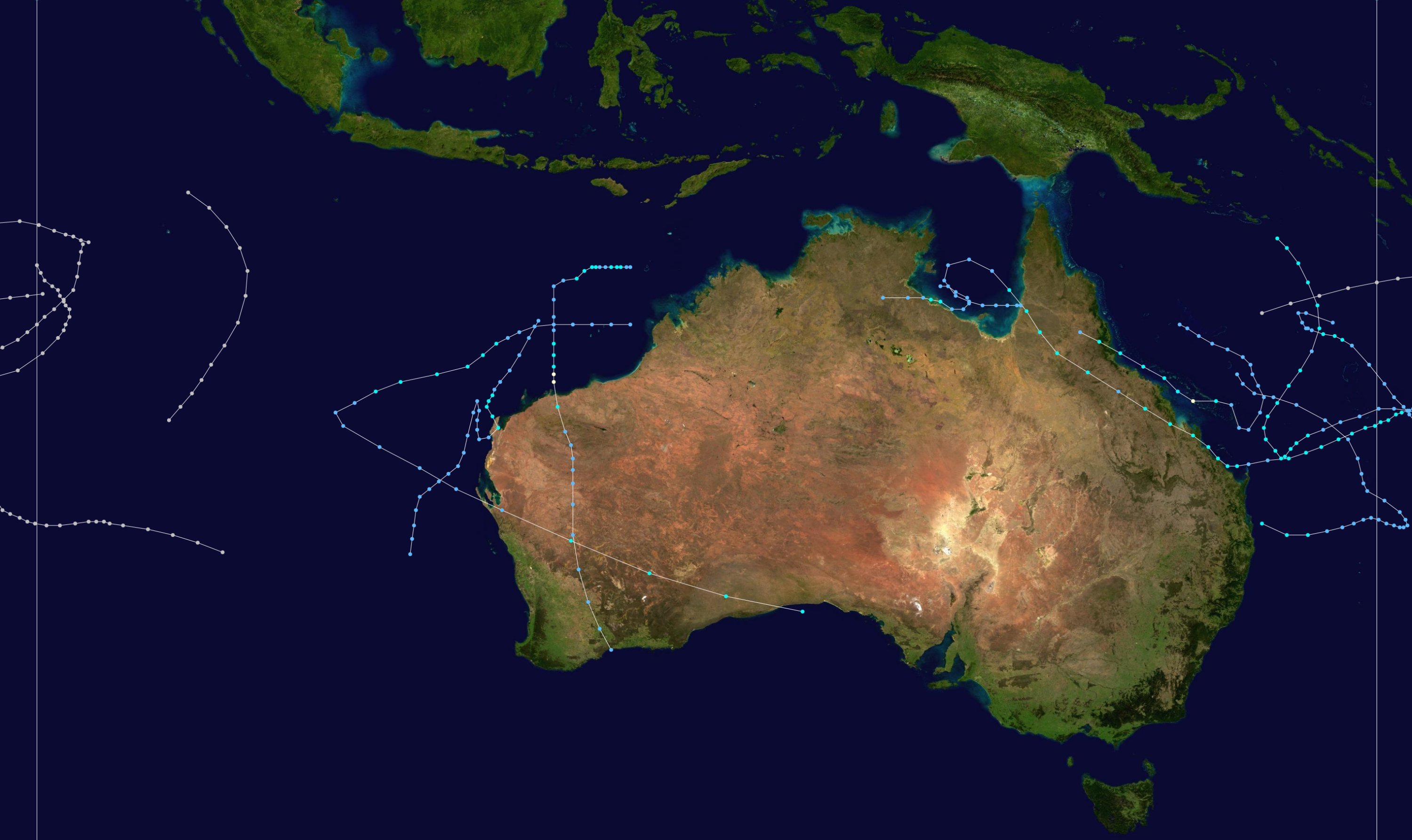
- Season summary map

Seasonal boundaries
- First system formed: 31 October 1970
- Last system dissipated: 29 March 1971

Strongest storm
- Name: Sheila-Sophie
  - Maximum winds: 215 km/h (130 mph) (10-minute sustained)
  - Lowest pressure: 925 hPa (mbar)

Seasonal statistics
- Tropical lows: 21
- Tropical cyclones: 21
- Severe tropical cyclones: 10
- Total fatalities: Unknown
- Total damage: Unknown

Related articles
- 1970–71 South Pacific cyclone season; 1970–71 South-West Indian Ocean cyclone season

The 1970–71 Australian region cyclone season was the second most active tropical cyclone season in the Australian Region.

== Systems ==
=== Severe Tropical Cyclone Andrea-Claudine ===
- Category 3 severe tropical cyclone (Australian scale)
- Tropical storm (SSHWS)
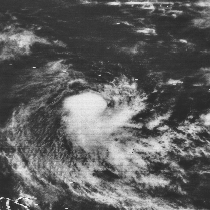
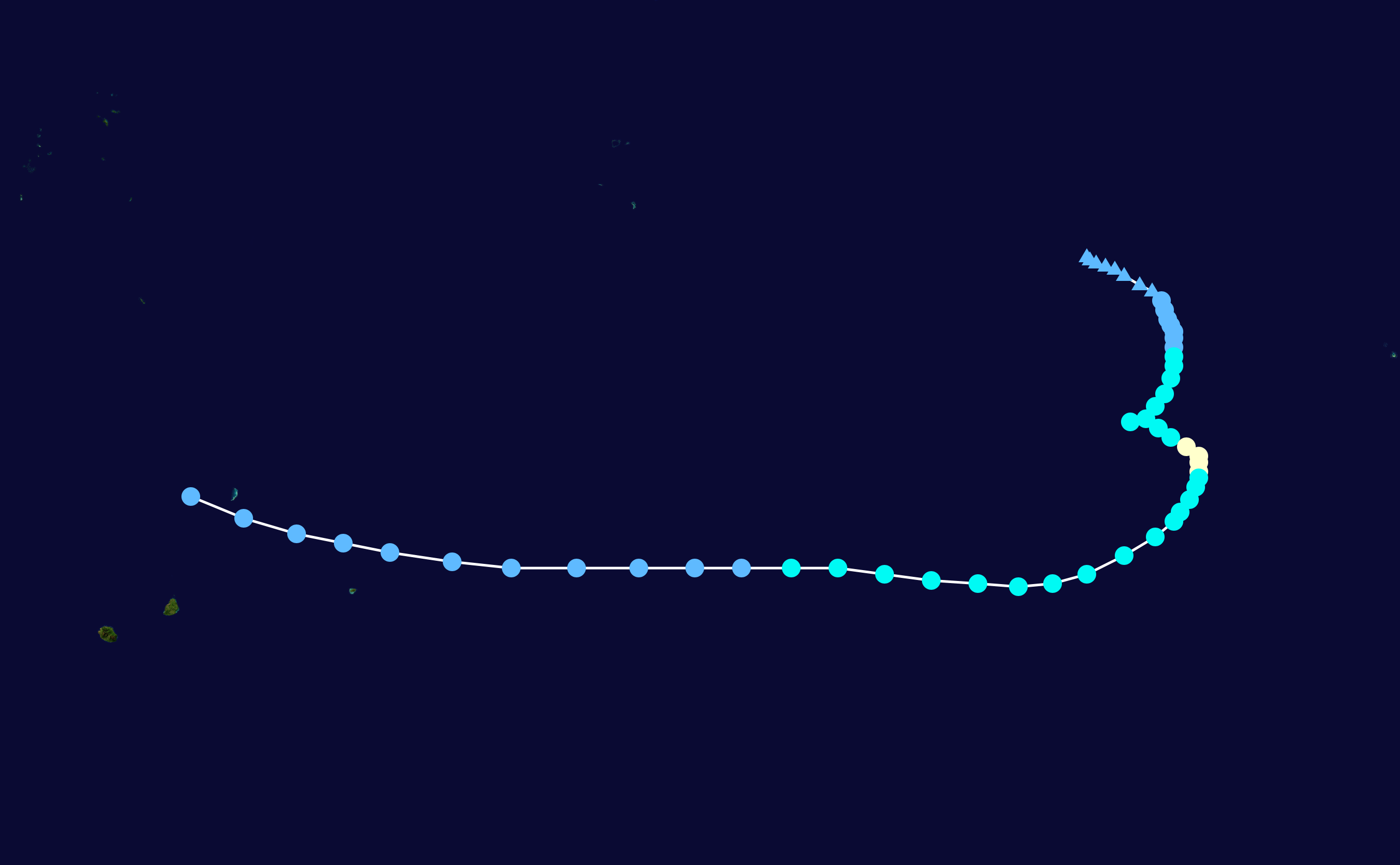
- Duration: October 31 – November 10 (Crossed 80°E)
- Peak intensity: 130 km/h (80 mph) (10-min); 970 hPa (mbar)

Andrea, 31 October to 11 November 1970 in central Indian Ocean

=== Tropical Cyclone Carmen ===
- Category 1 tropical cyclone (Australian scale)
- Tropical storm (SSHWS)
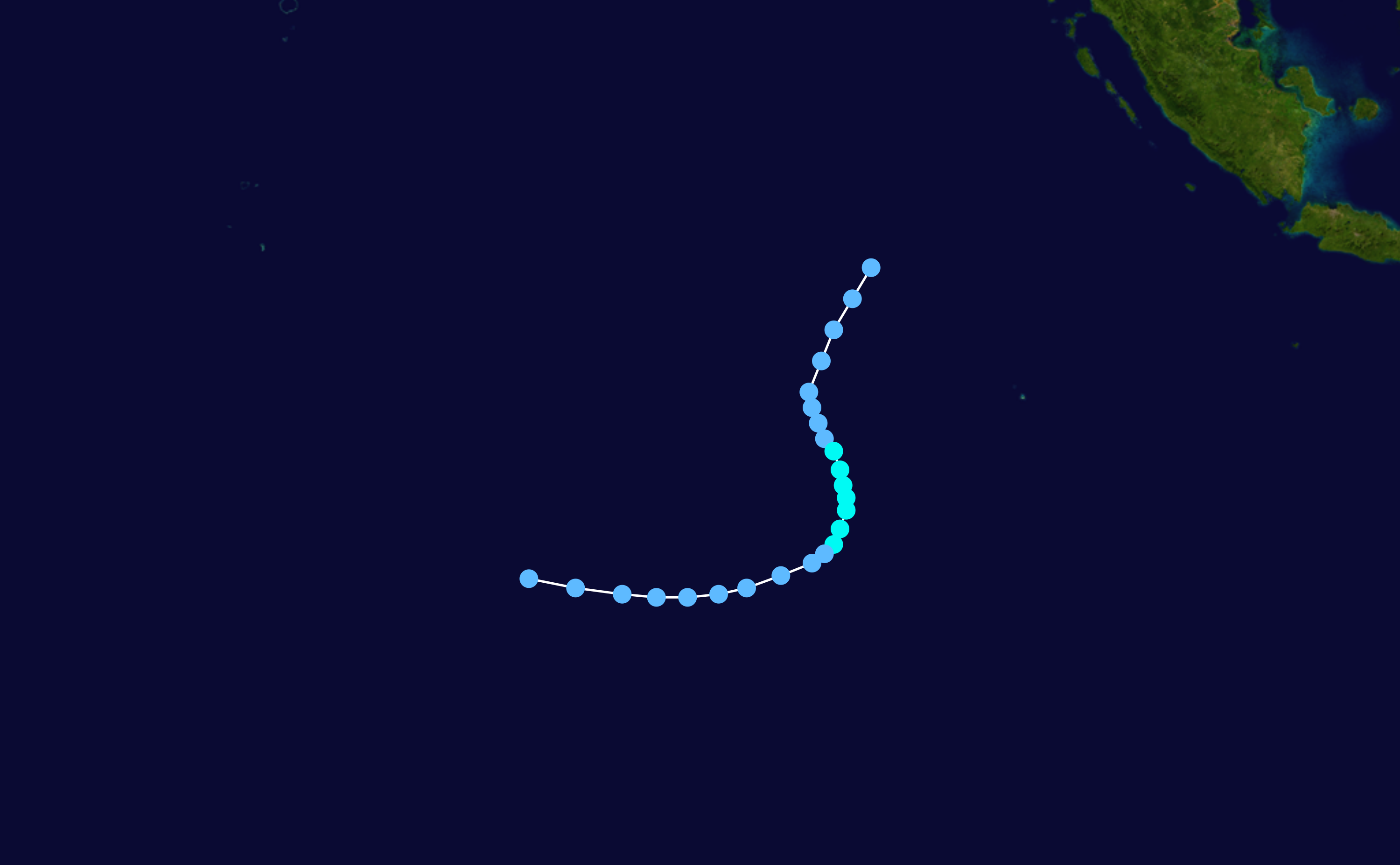
- Duration: November 20 – November 26 (Crossed 80°E)
- Peak intensity: 85 km/h (50 mph) (10-min); 990 hPa (mbar)

Tropical Cyclone Carmen developed on November 20 and left the basin on November 26.

=== Severe Tropical Cyclone Beverley-Eva ===
- Category 3 severe tropical cyclone (Australian scale)
- Category 1 tropical cyclone (SSHWS)
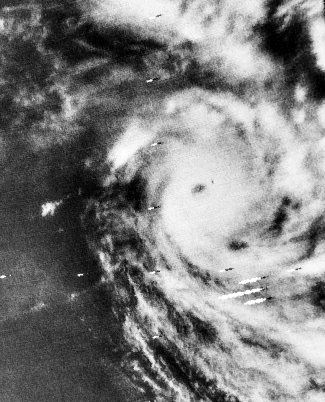
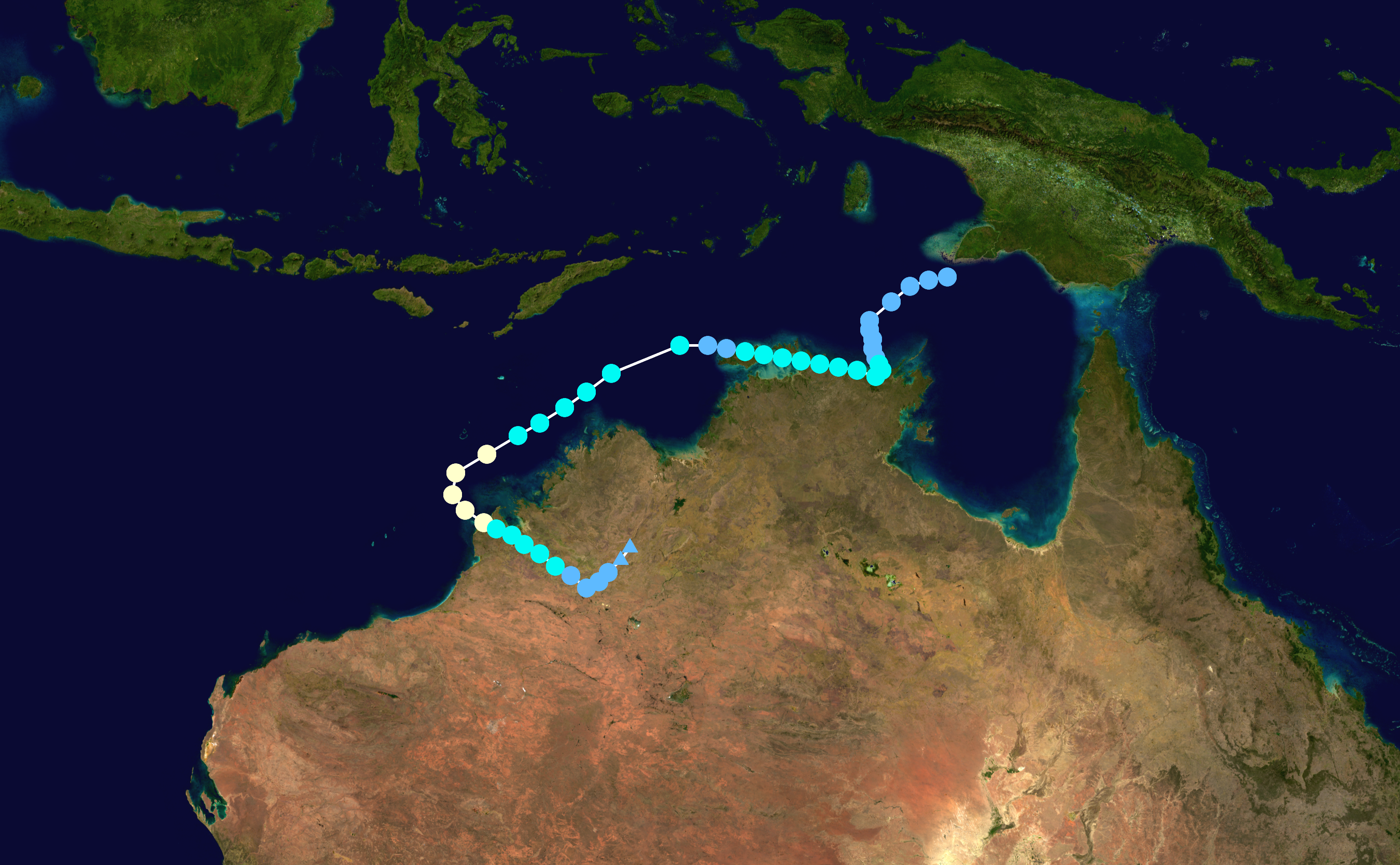
- Duration: November 26 – December 7
- Peak intensity: 130 km/h (80 mph) (10-min); 970 hPa (mbar)

Beverley, 26 November to 1 December 1970 in Arafura Sea. The decayed storm developed into Eva.

=== Severe Tropical Cyclone Dominique-Hilary ===
- Category 3 severe tropical cyclone (Australian scale)
- Tropical storm (SSHWS)
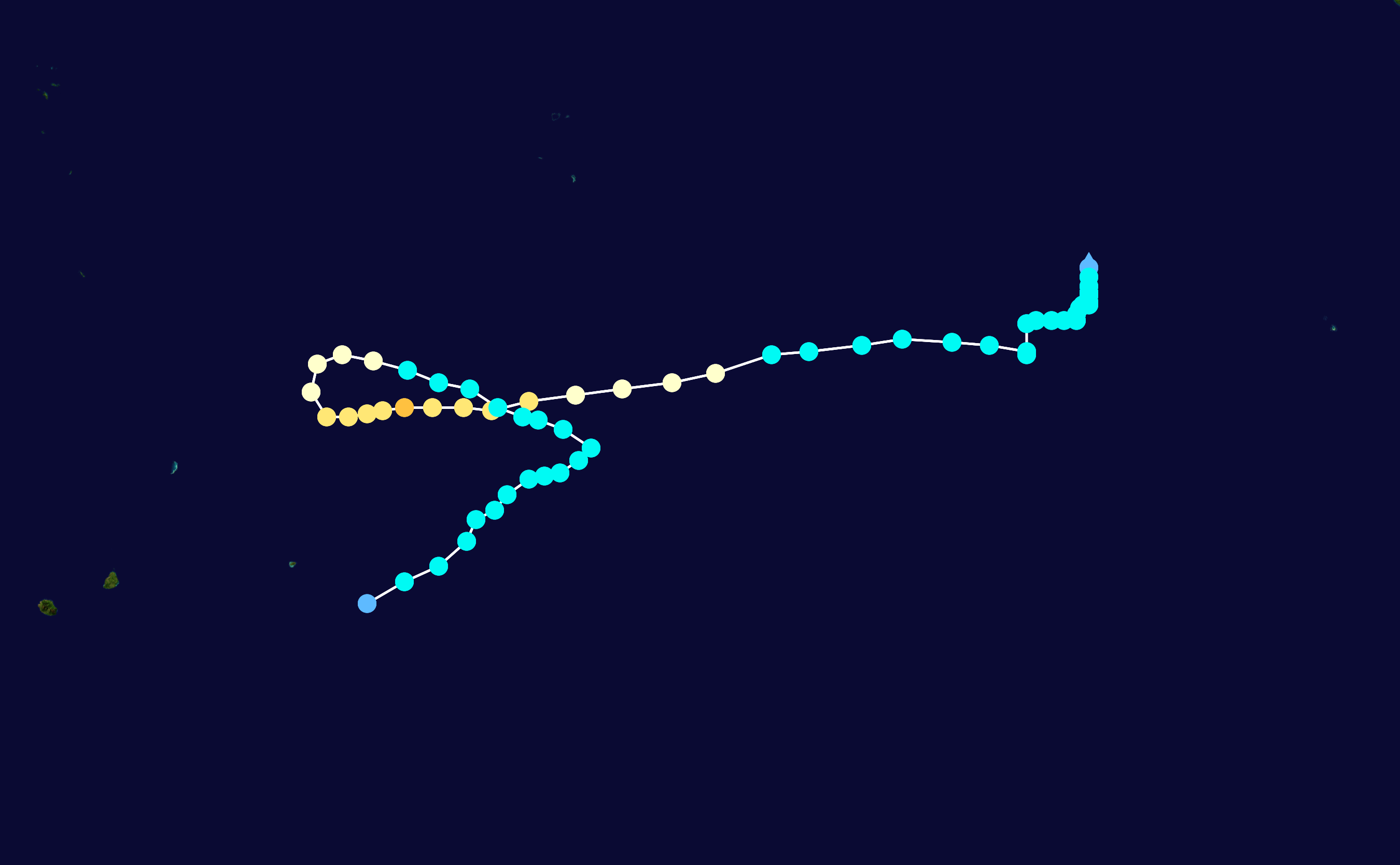
- Duration: December 11 – December 17 (Crossed 80°E)
- Peak intensity: 120 km/h (75 mph) (10-min); 974 hPa (mbar)

Severe Tropical Cyclone Dominique-Hilary developed on December 11 and left the basin on December 17.

=== Tropical Cyclone Janet ===
- Category 2 tropical cyclone (Australian scale)
- Tropical storm (SSHWS)
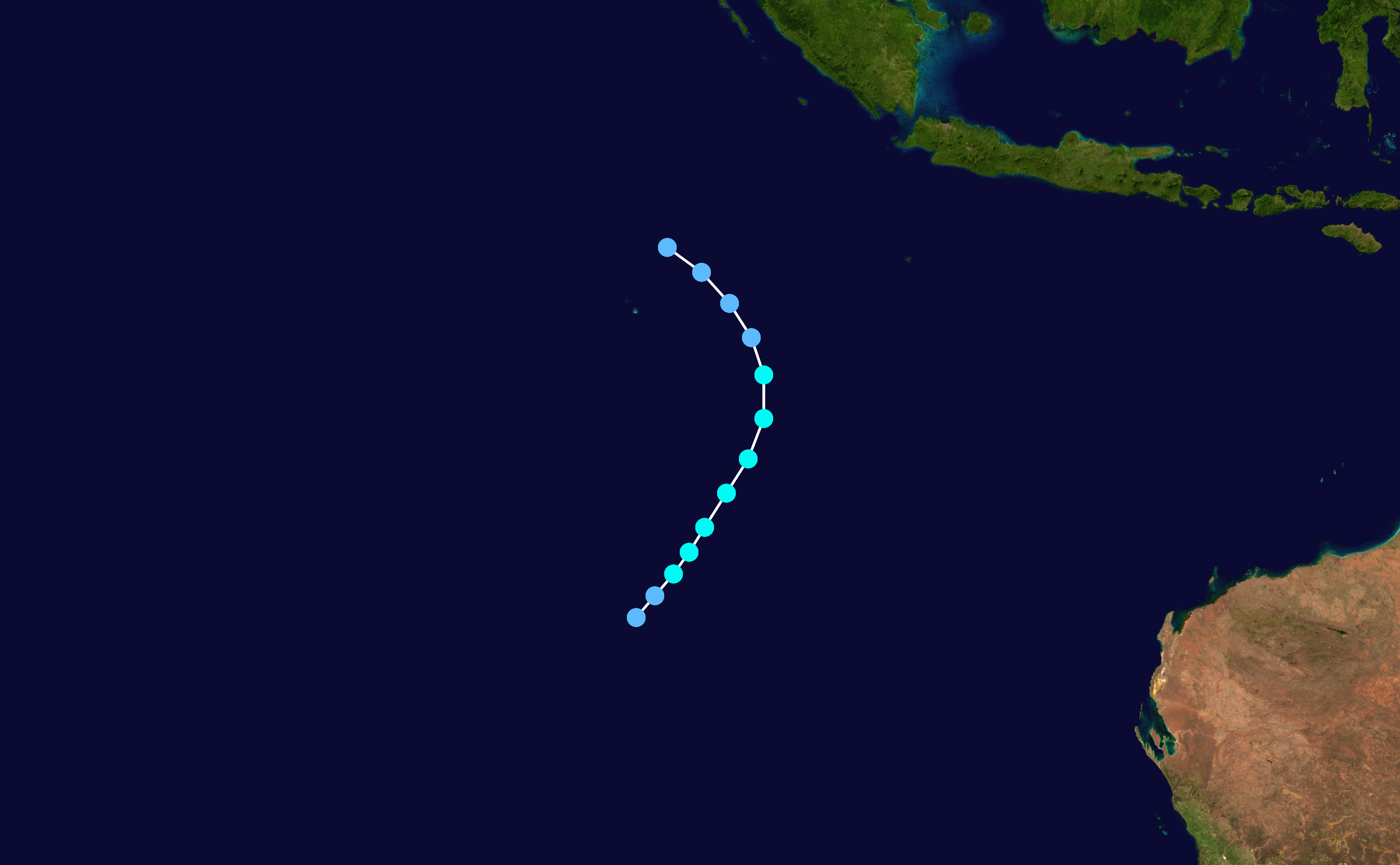
- Duration: December 19 – December 25
- Peak intensity: 110 km/h (70 mph) (10-min); 980 hPa (mbar)

Janet, 19 to 25 December 1970 in central Indian Ocean

=== Tropical Cyclone Loris ===
- Category 2 tropical cyclone (Australian scale)
- Tropical storm (SSHWS)
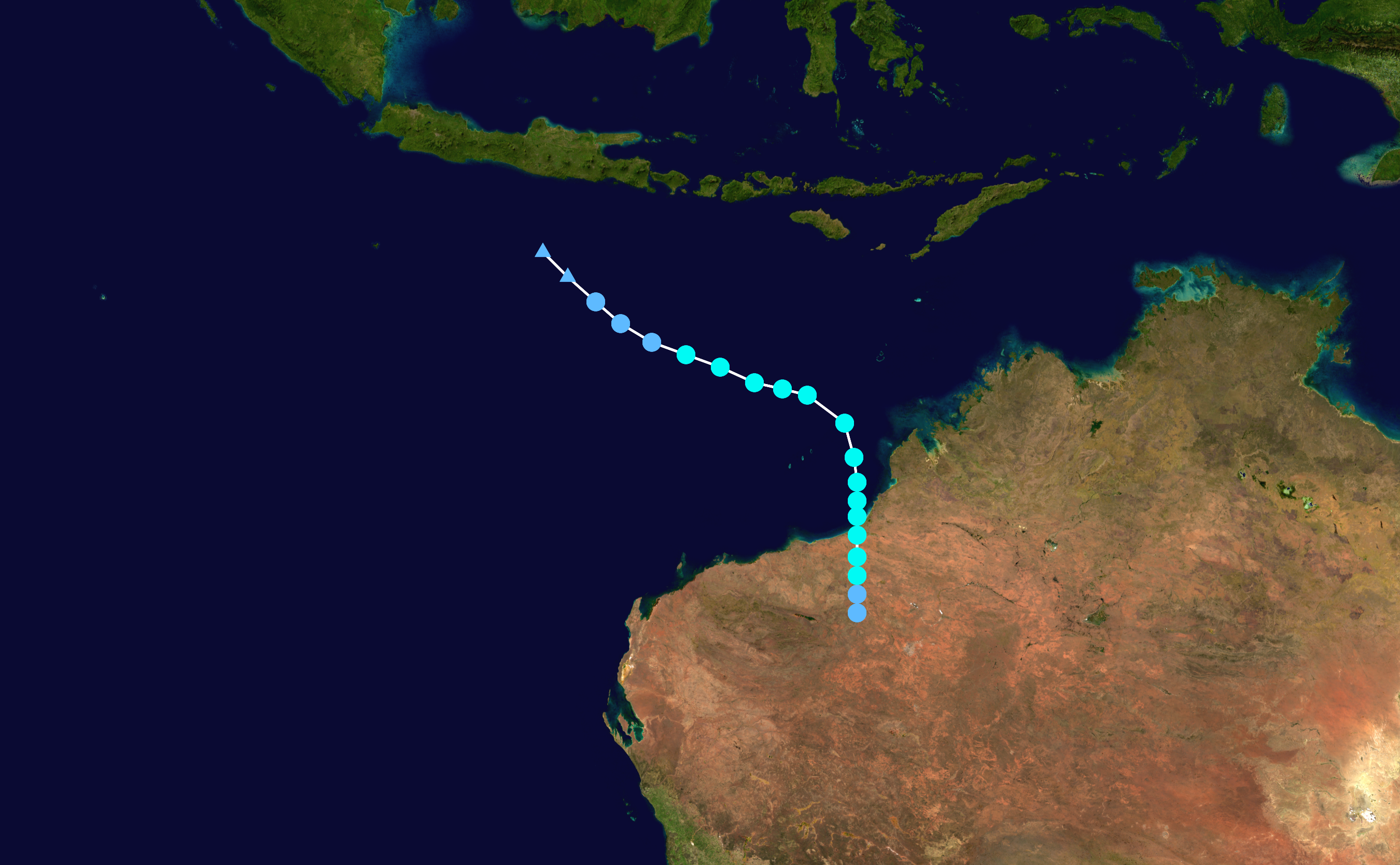
- Duration: December 26 – December 31
- Peak intensity: 110 km/h (70 mph) (10-min); 980 hPa (mbar)

Loris, 26 to 31 December 1970 crossed the Pilbara coast near Mandora with no serious damage.

=== Severe Tropical Cyclone Myrtle-Ginette ===
- Category 3 severe tropical cyclone (Australian scale)
- Tropical storm (SSHWS)
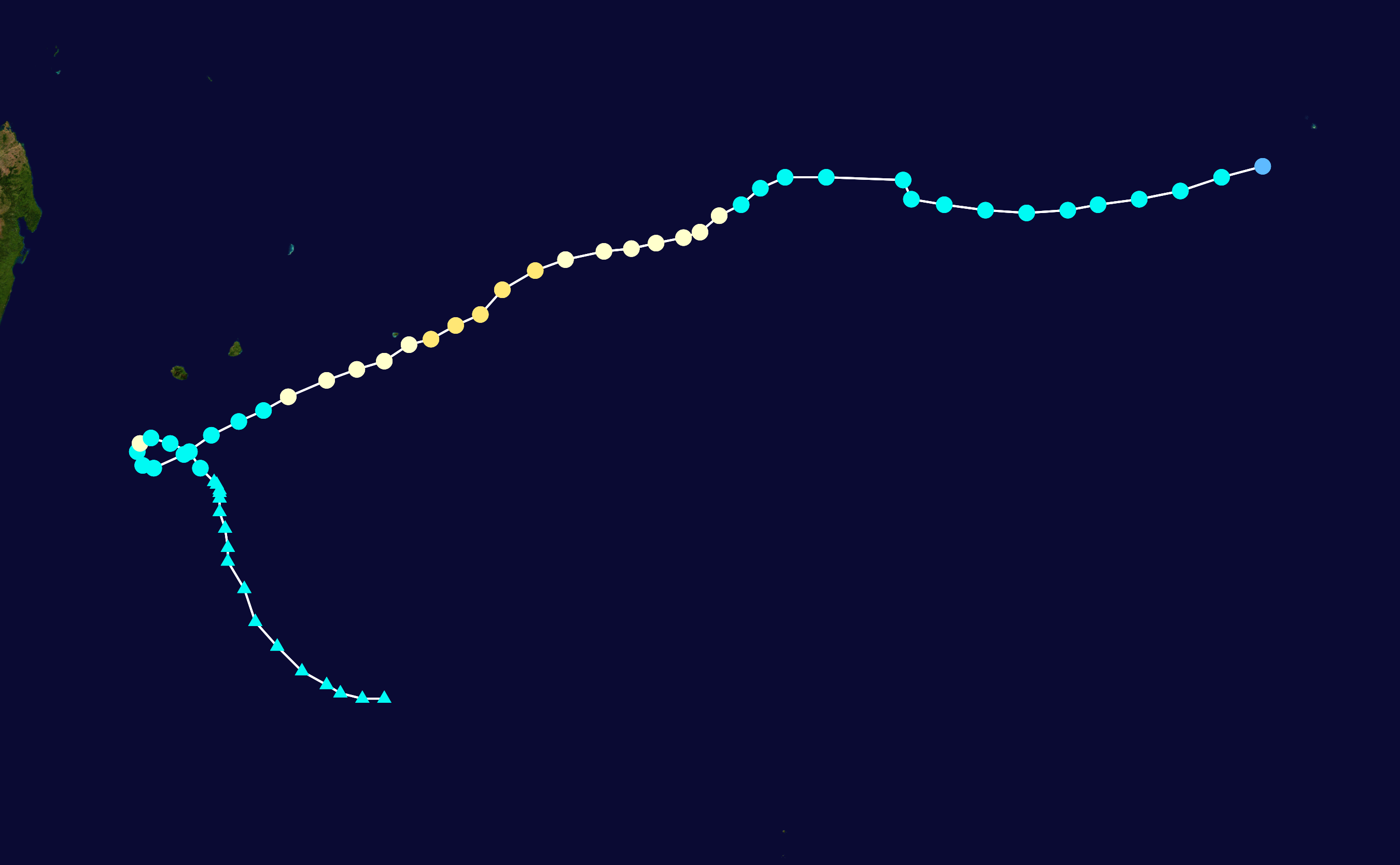
- Duration: January 15 – January 18 (Crossed 80°E)
- Peak intensity: 120 km/h (75 mph) (10-min); 976 hPa (mbar)

Myrtle-Ginette, 15 to 18 January 1971 near Cocos Island and moved west

=== Tropical Cyclone Polly ===
- Category 2 tropical cyclone (Australian scale)
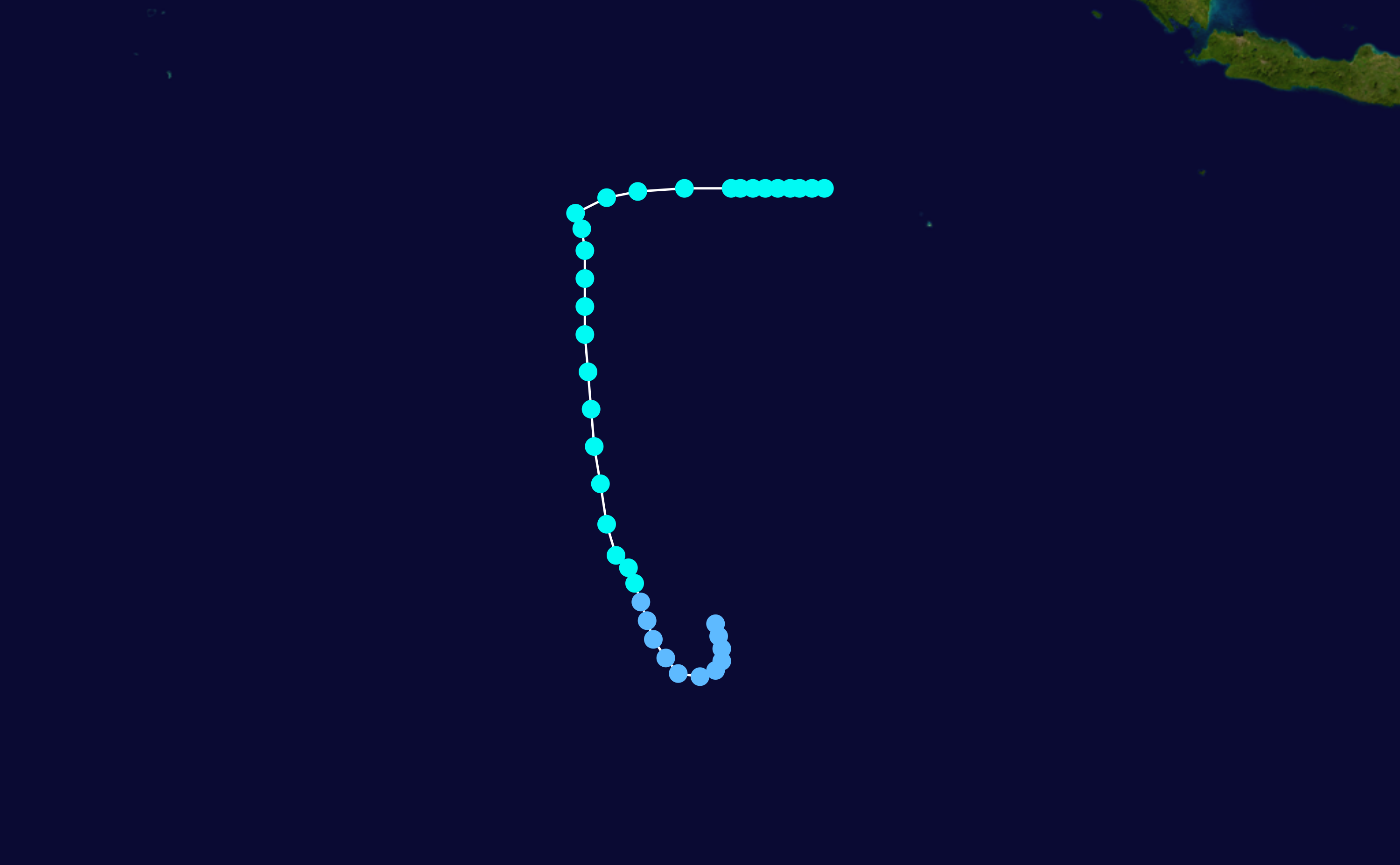
- Duration: January 20 – January 29
- Peak intensity: 110 km/h (70 mph) (10-min); 980 hPa (mbar)

Polly formed in the Indian Ocean west of the Keeling Islands and existed from 20 to 29 January.

=== Tropical Cyclone Rita ===
- Category 2 tropical cyclone (Australian scale)
- Tropical storm (SSHWS)
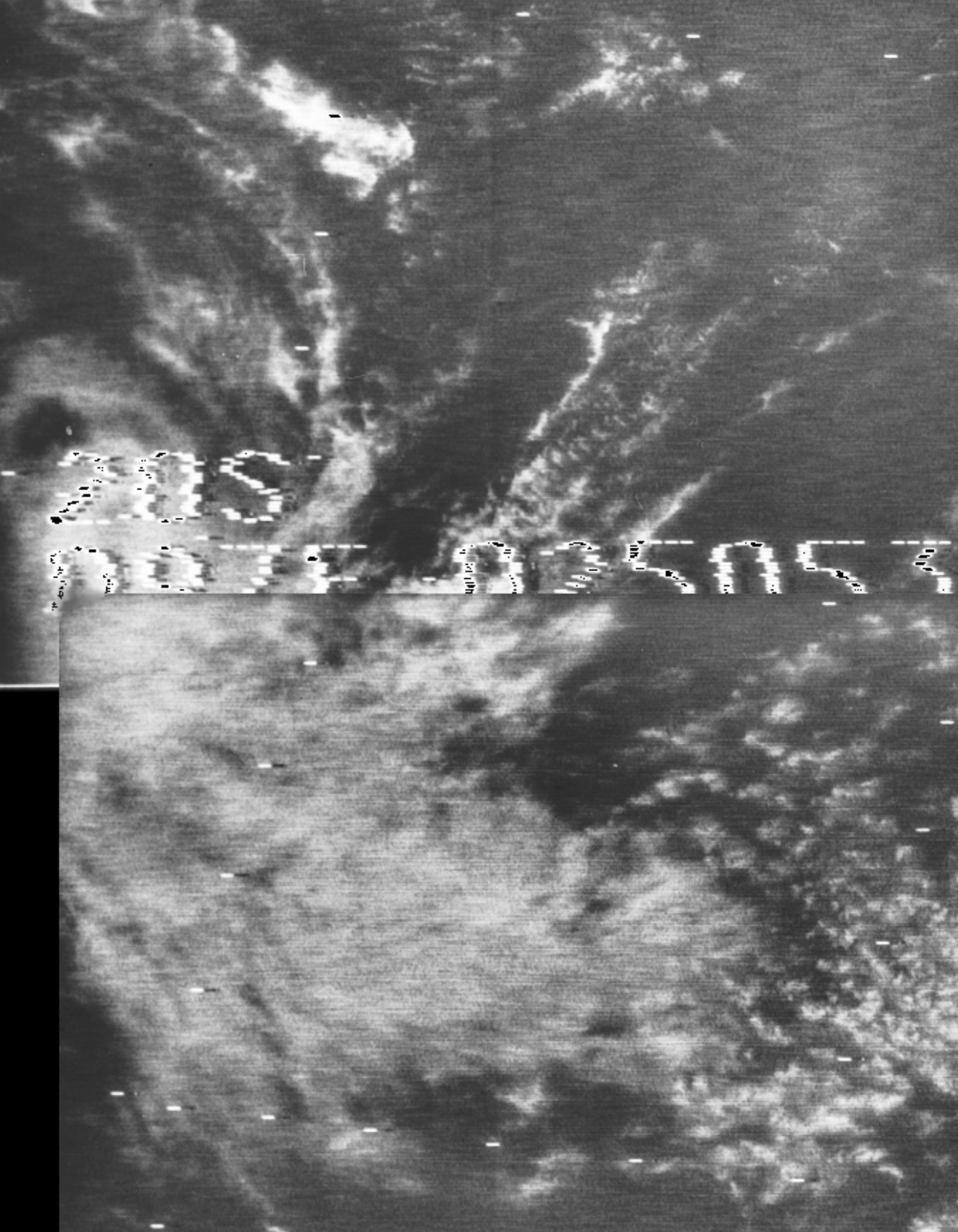
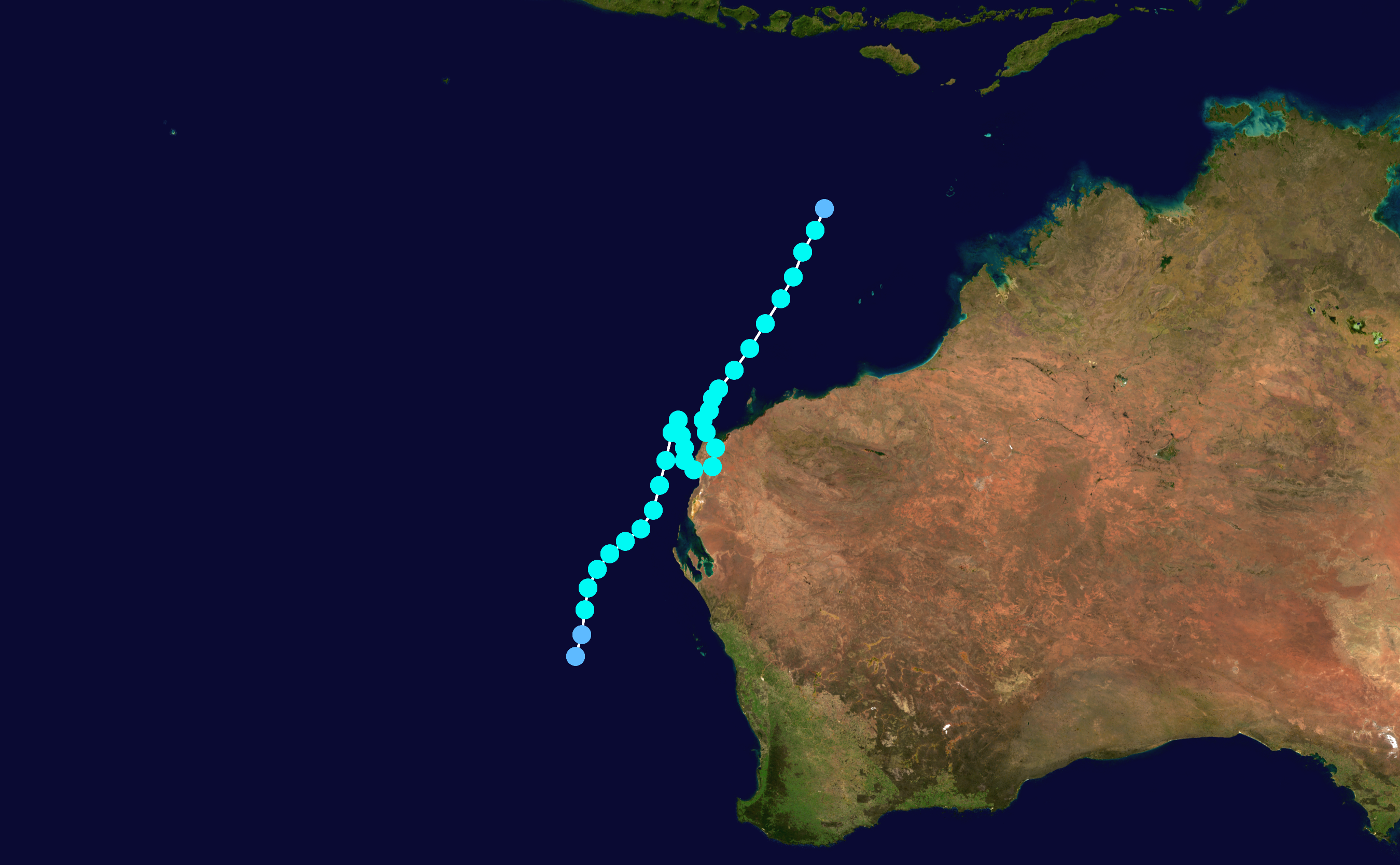
- Duration: January 22 – January 30
- Peak intensity: 110 km/h (70 mph) (10-min); 980 hPa (mbar)

Rita existed from 23 to 30 January 1971 passed over Exmouth, Western Australia with flood damage only.

=== Severe Tropical Cyclone Sheila-Sophie ===
- Category 5 severe tropical cyclone (Australian scale)
- Category 4 tropical cyclone (SSHWS)
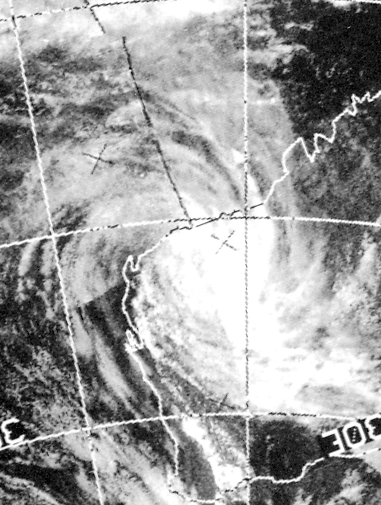
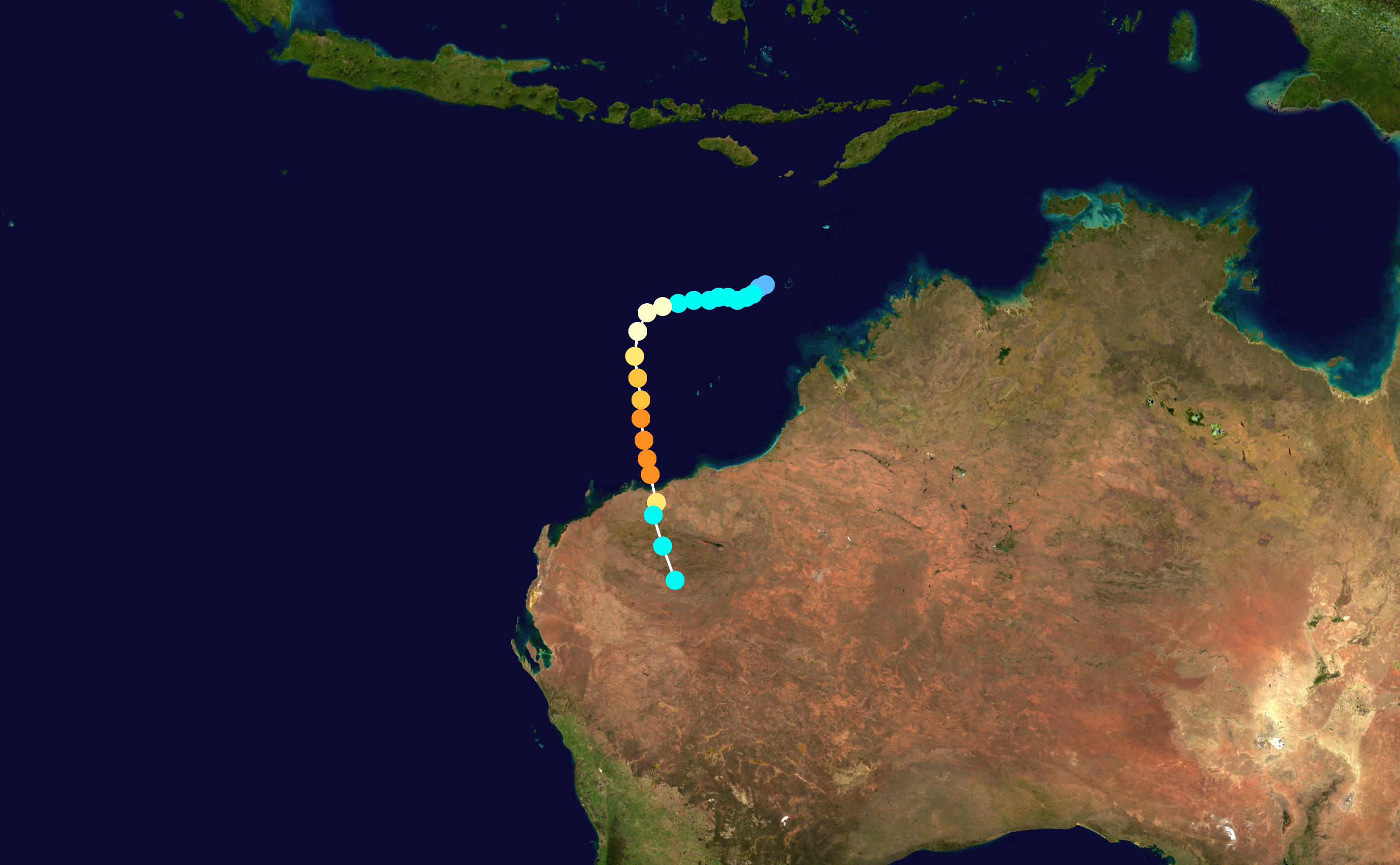
- Duration: January 29 – February 4
- Peak intensity: 215 km/h (130 mph) (10-min); 925 hPa (mbar)

Sheila-Sophie, 29 January to 6 February 1971 crossed the coast near Roebourne, Western Australia, while doing some damage.

=== Tropical Cyclone Aggie ===
- Category 2 tropical cyclone (Australian scale)
- Tropical storm (SSHWS)
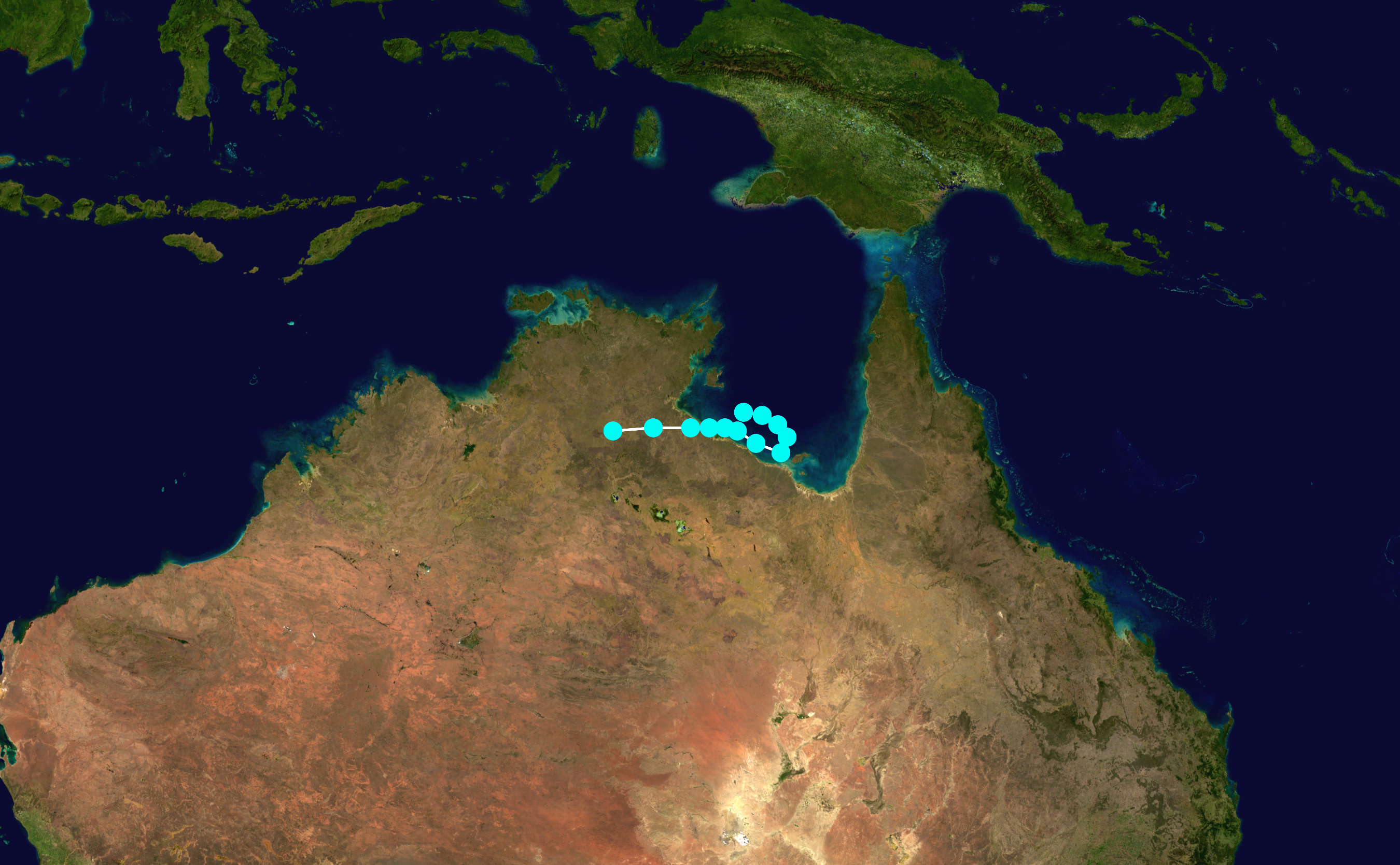
- Duration: February 1 – February 4
- Peak intensity: 100 km/h (65 mph) (10-min); 984 hPa (mbar)

Aggie, 1 to 4 February 1971 in Gulf of Carpentaria and Arnhem Land

=== Tropical Cyclone Dora ===
- Category 1 tropical cyclone (Australian scale)
- Tropical storm (SSHWS)
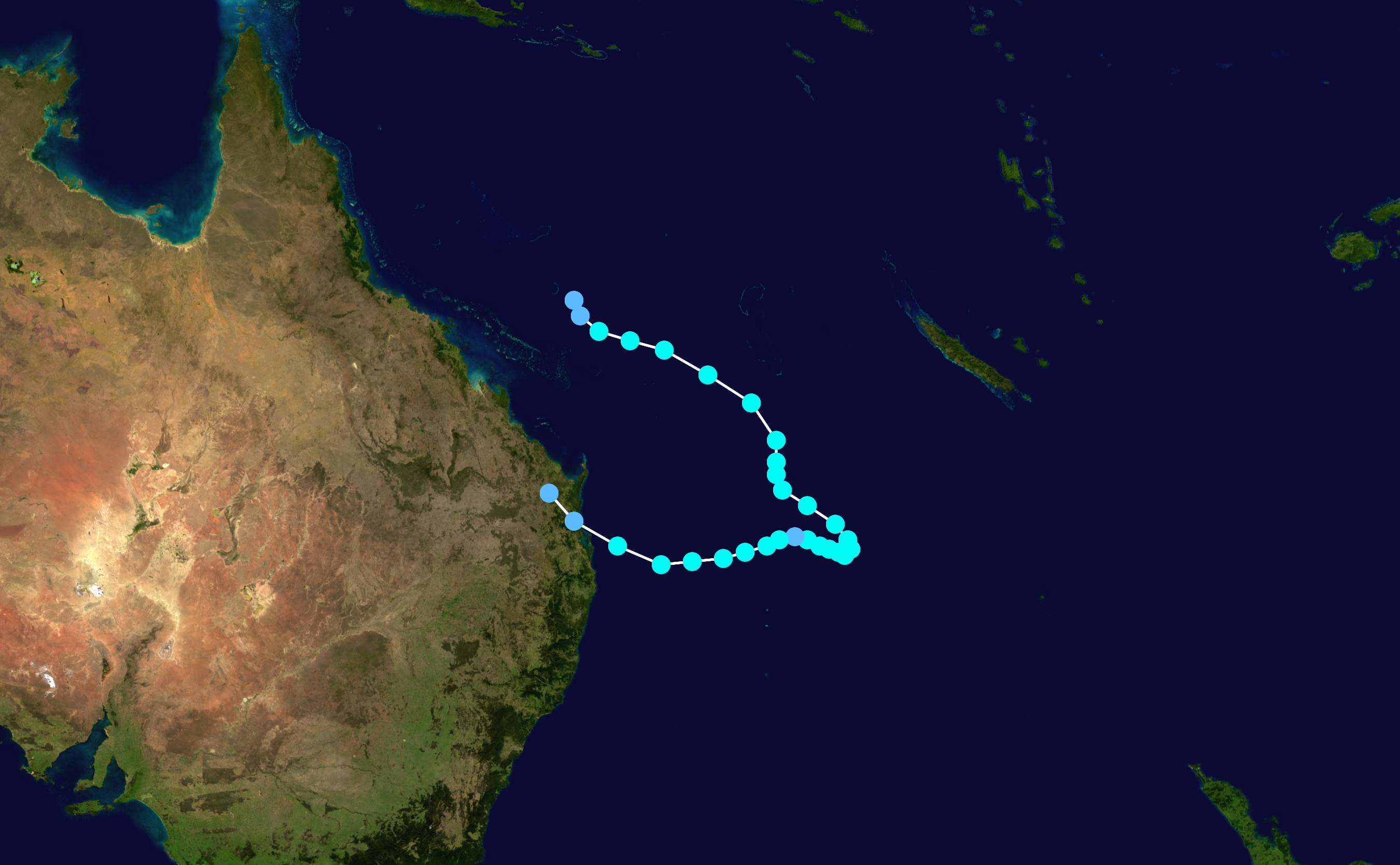
- Duration: February 10 – February 17
- Peak intensity: 85 km/h (50 mph) (10-min); 990 hPa (mbar)

Cyclone Dora formed in the Coral sea east of Proserpine on February 10, 1971, it took a southeasterly track over the next 4 days away from the QLD coast turning into a low-pressure system well east of the QLD NSW border. On February 17 the system reintensified into a cyclone east of the Gold Coast and crossed the coast north of Brisbane at Redcliffe. Widespread structural damage was reported with power lines down and roofs removed.

=== Severe Tropical Cyclone Tilly-Iphigenie ===
- Category 3 severe tropical cyclone (Australian scale)
- Category 1 tropical cyclone (SSHWS)
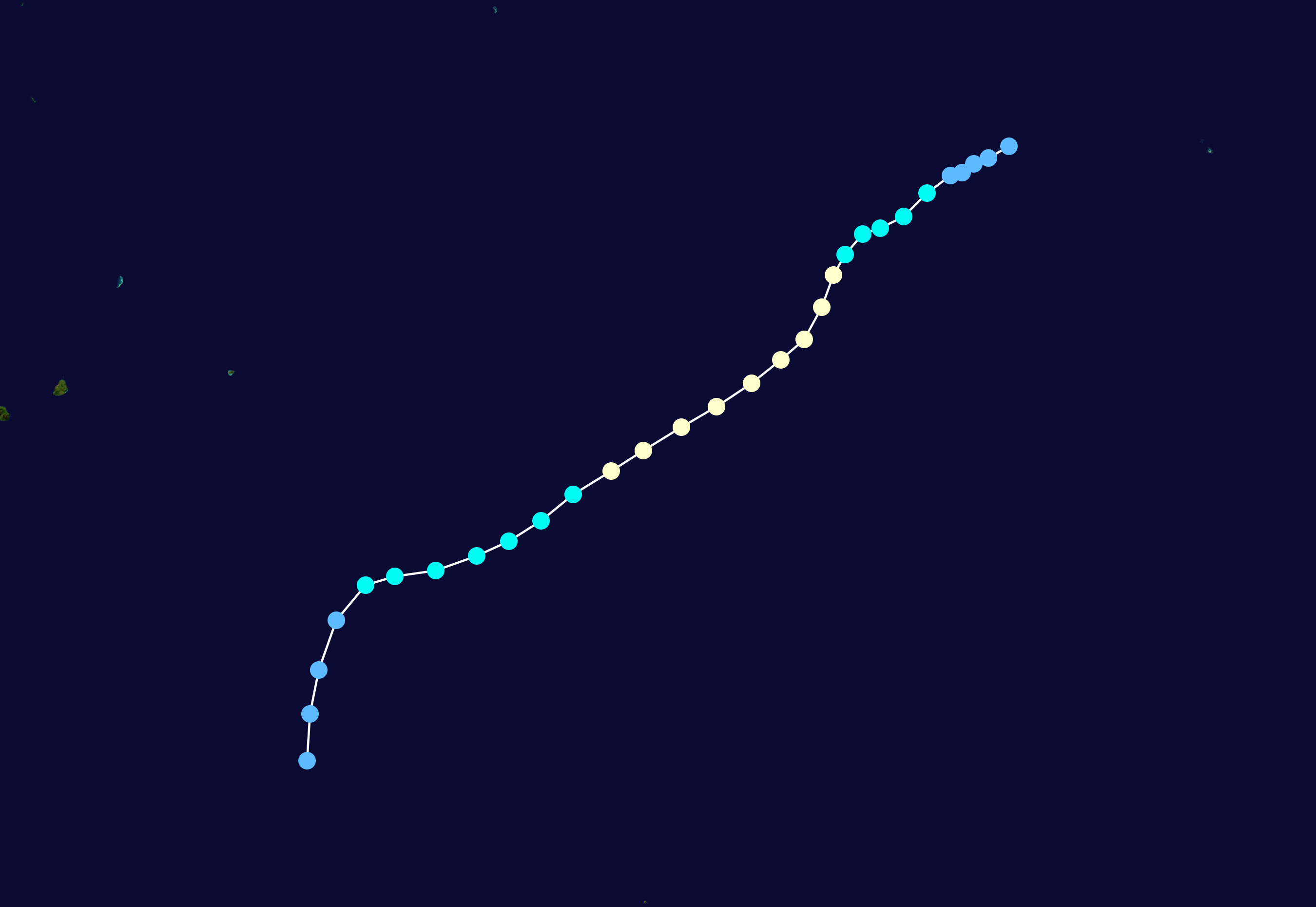
- Duration: February 10 – February 14
- Peak intensity: 130 km/h (80 mph) (10-min); 970 hPa (mbar)

Severe Tropical Cyclone Tilly-Iphigenie existed from February 10 to February 14.

=== Tropical Cyclone Gertie ===
- Category 2 tropical cyclone (Australian scale)
- Tropical storm (SSHWS)
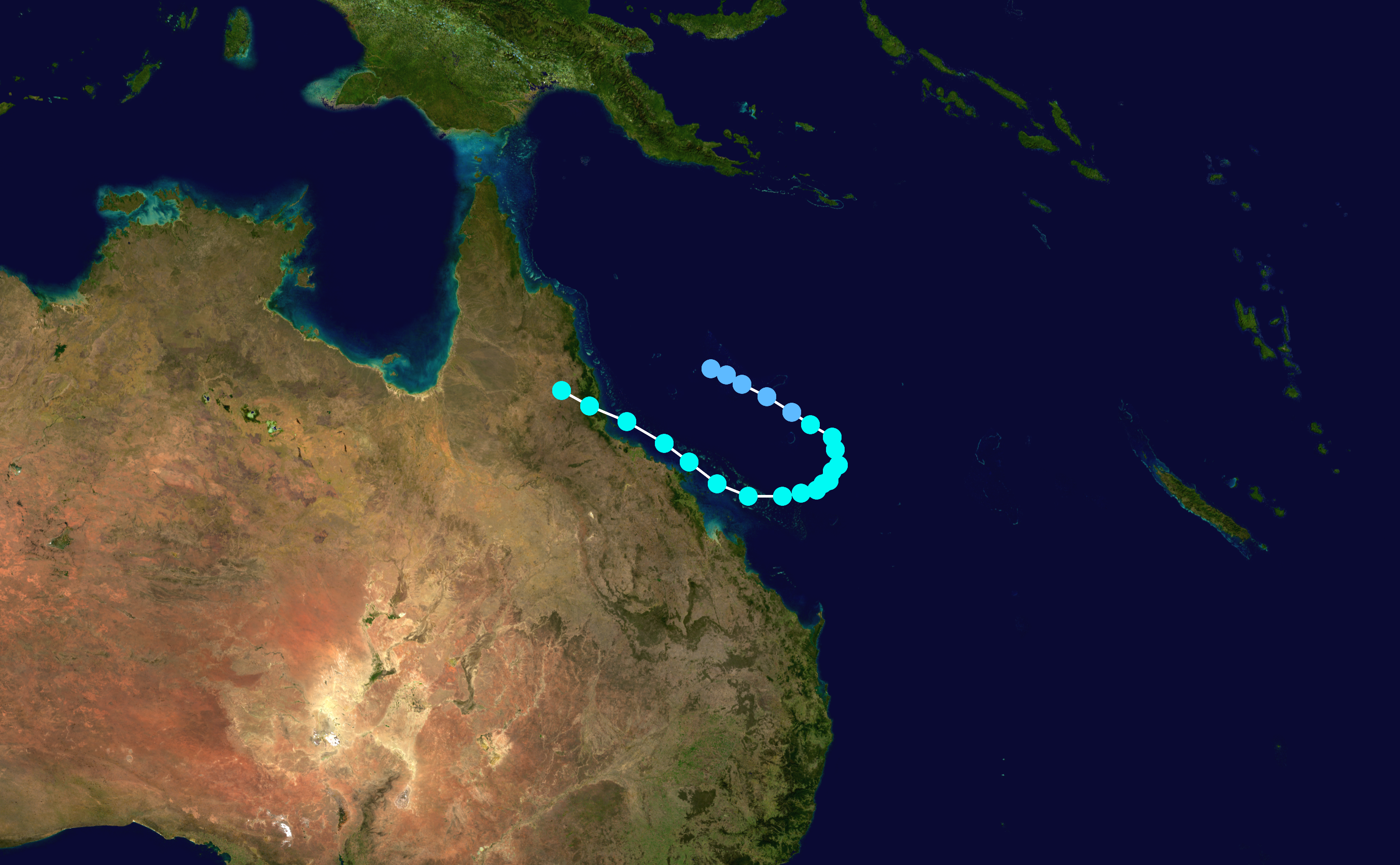
- Duration: February 11 – February 16
- Peak intensity: 100 km/h (65 mph) (10-min); 983 hPa (mbar)

Gertie, 11 to 16 February 1971 crossed near Townsville, Queensland.

=== Tropical Cyclone Ida ===
- Category 2 tropical cyclone (Australian scale)
- Tropical storm (SSHWS)
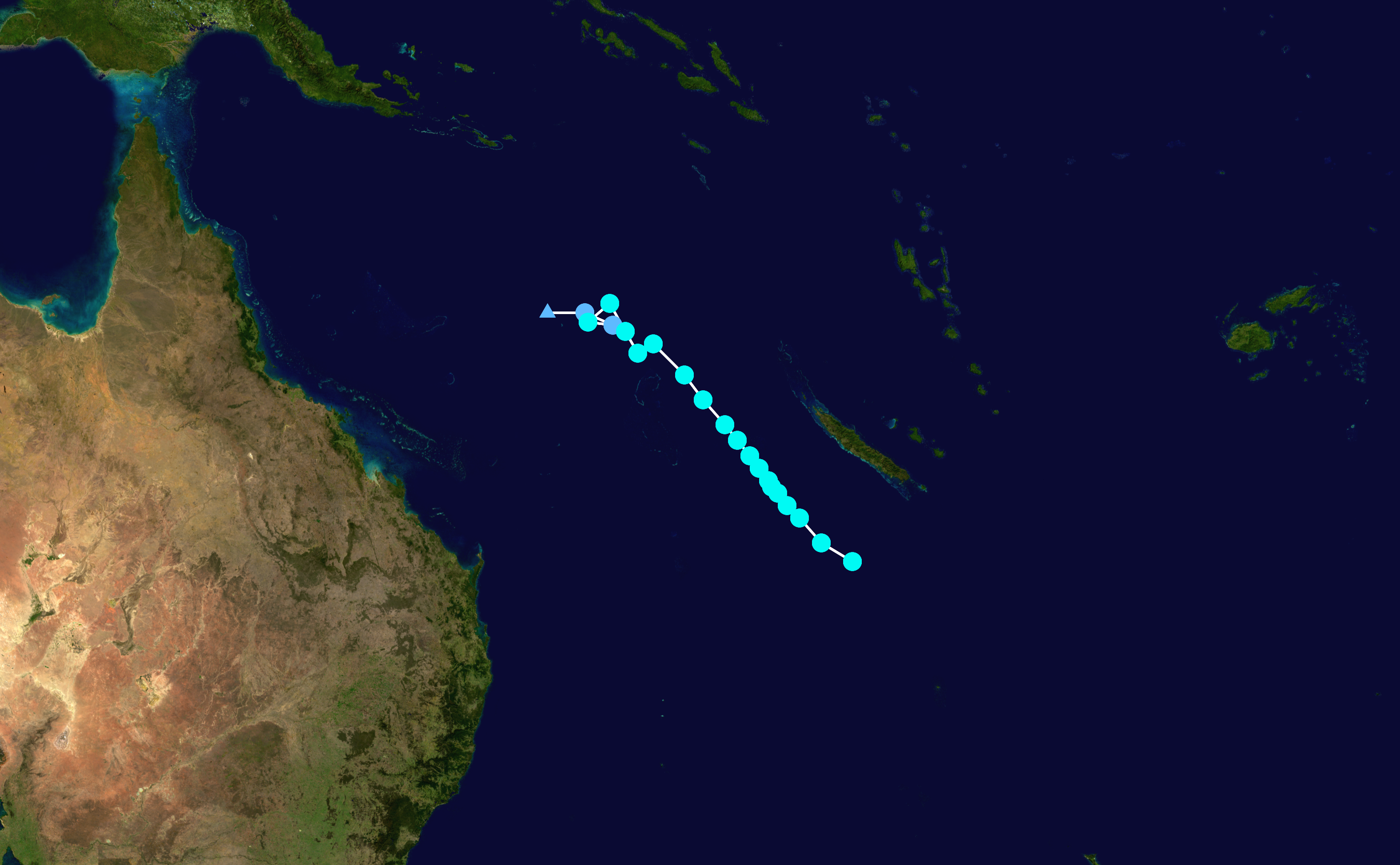
- Duration: February 15 – February 18 (Crossed 160°E)
- Peak intensity: 110 km/h (70 mph) (10-min); 980 hPa (mbar)

Ida, 15 to 22 February 1971 in Coral Sea

=== Tropical Cyclone Kalinka ===
- Category 1 tropical cyclone (Australian scale)
- Tropical storm (SSHWS)
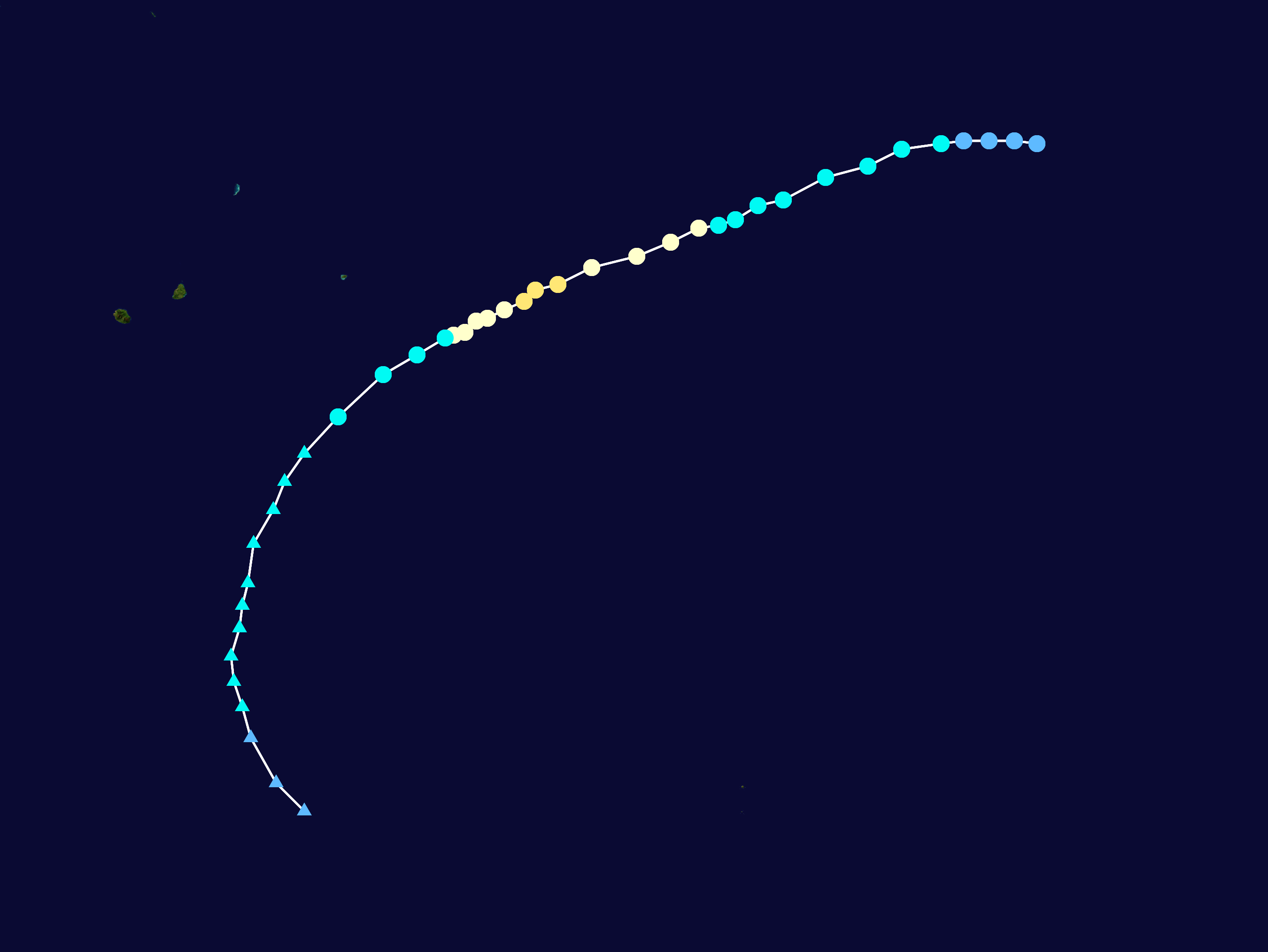
- Duration: February 16 – February 18 (Crossed 80°E)
- Peak intensity: 85 km/h (50 mph) (10-min);

=== Severe Tropical Cyclone Fiona ===
- Category 3 severe tropical cyclone (Australian scale)
- Category 2 tropical cyclone (SSHWS)
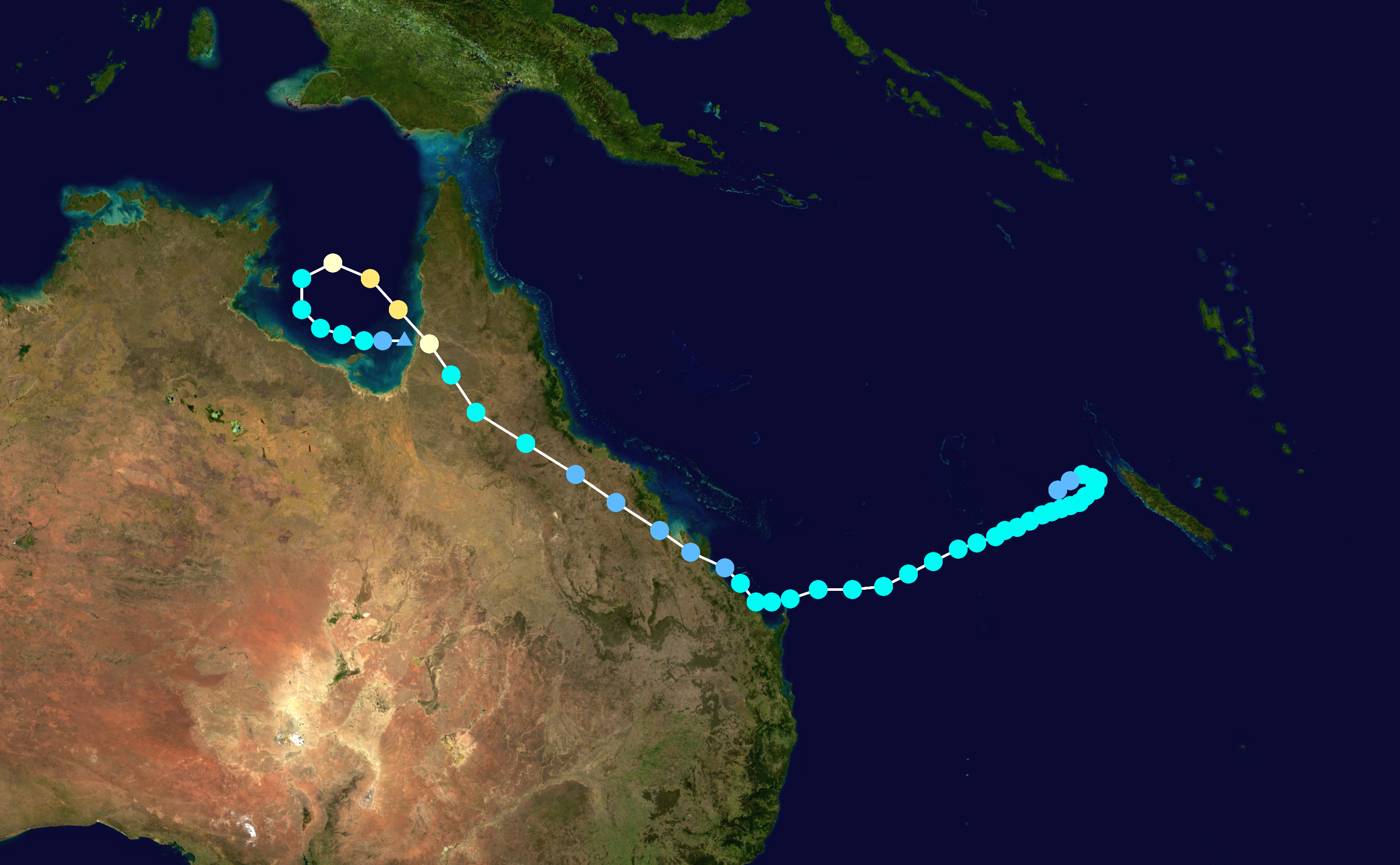
- Duration: February 16 – February 28
- Peak intensity: 155 km/h (100 mph) (10-min); 960 hPa (mbar)

Severe Tropical Cyclone Fiona existed from February 16 to February 28.

=== Severe Tropical Cyclone Yvonne-Lise ===
- Category 3 severe tropical cyclone (Australian scale)
- Tropical storm (SSHWS)
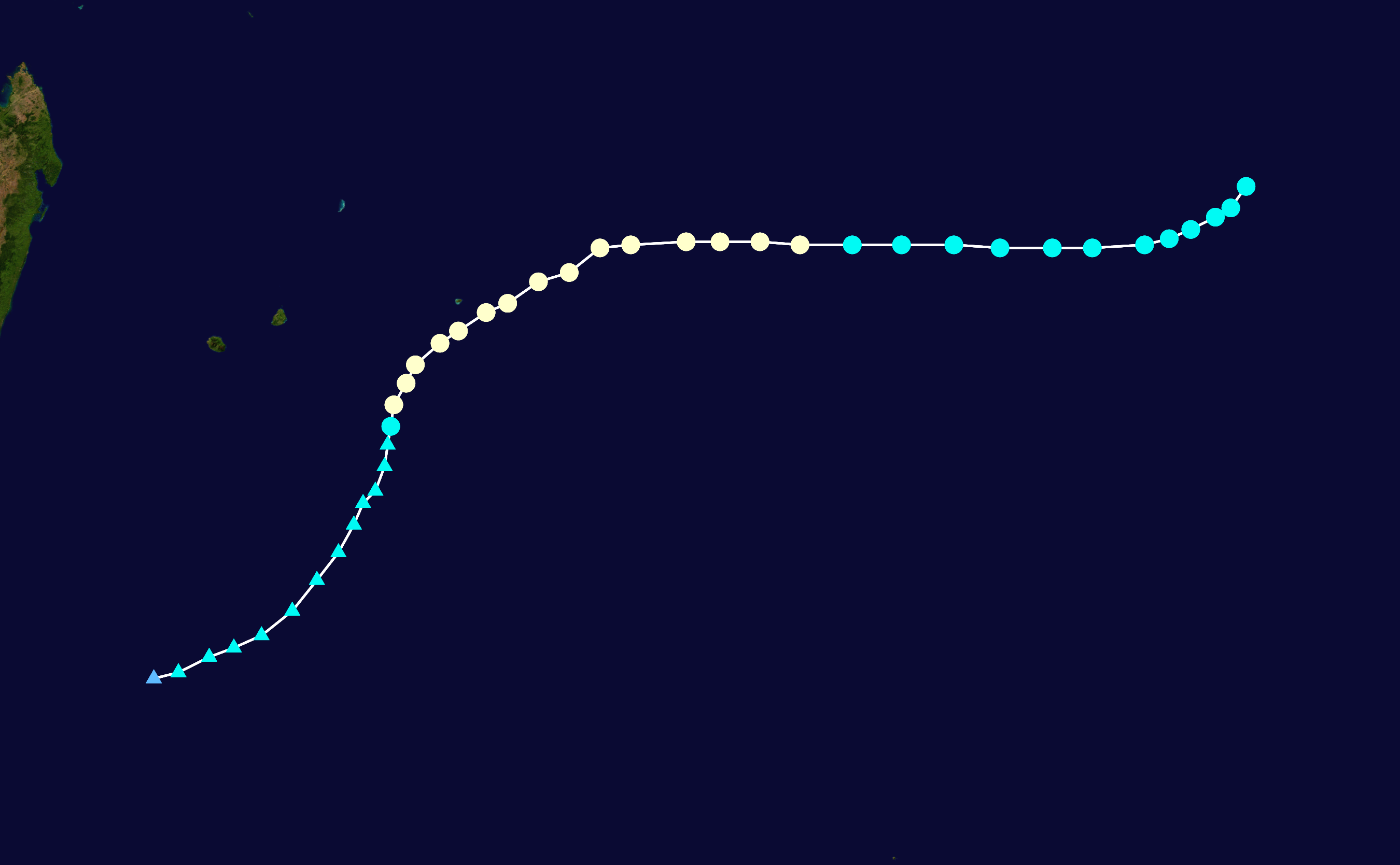
- Duration: February 19 – February 23 (Crossed 80°E)
- Peak intensity: 120 km/h (75 mph) (10-min); 975 hPa (mbar)

Severe Tropical Cyclone Yvonne-Lise developed on February 19 and left the basin on February 23.

=== Severe Tropical Cyclone Maggie-Muriel ===
- Category 3 severe tropical cyclone (Australian scale)
- Category 2 tropical cyclone (SSHWS)
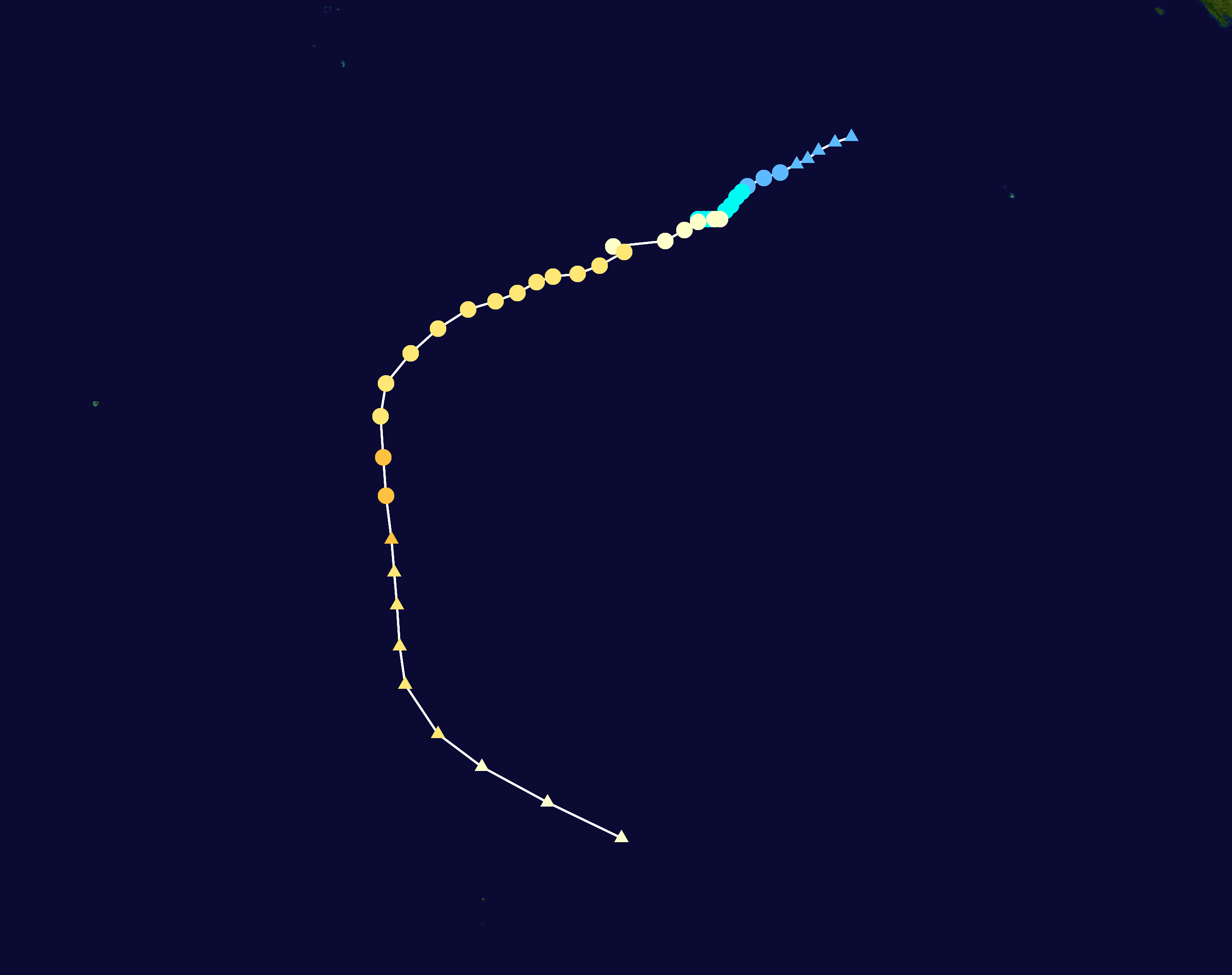
- Duration: March 7 – March 13 (Crossed 80°E)
- Peak intensity: 155 km/h (100 mph) (10-min); 960 hPa (mbar)

Severe Tropical Cyclone Maggie-Muriel developed on March 7 and left the basin on March 13.

=== Tropical Cyclone Lena ===
- Category 2 tropical cyclone (Australian scale)
- Tropical storm (SSHWS)
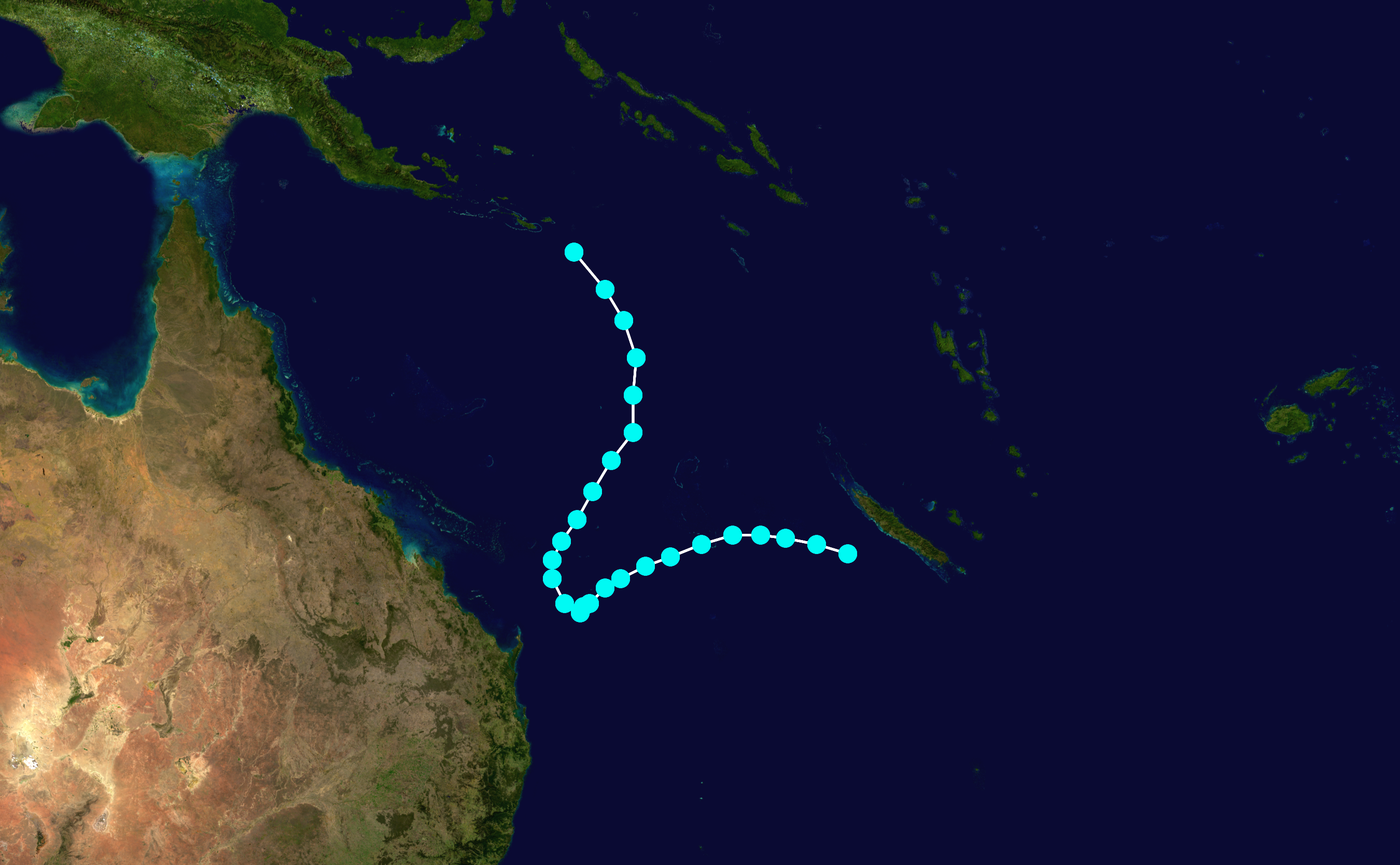
- Duration: March 13 – March 18 (Crossed 160°E)
- Peak intensity: 110 km/h (70 mph) (10-min); 980 hPa (mbar)

Lena, 13 to 20 March 1971 near New Caledonia

=== Severe Tropical Cyclone Mavis ===
- Category 3 severe tropical cyclone (Australian scale)
- Category 1 tropical cyclone (SSHWS)
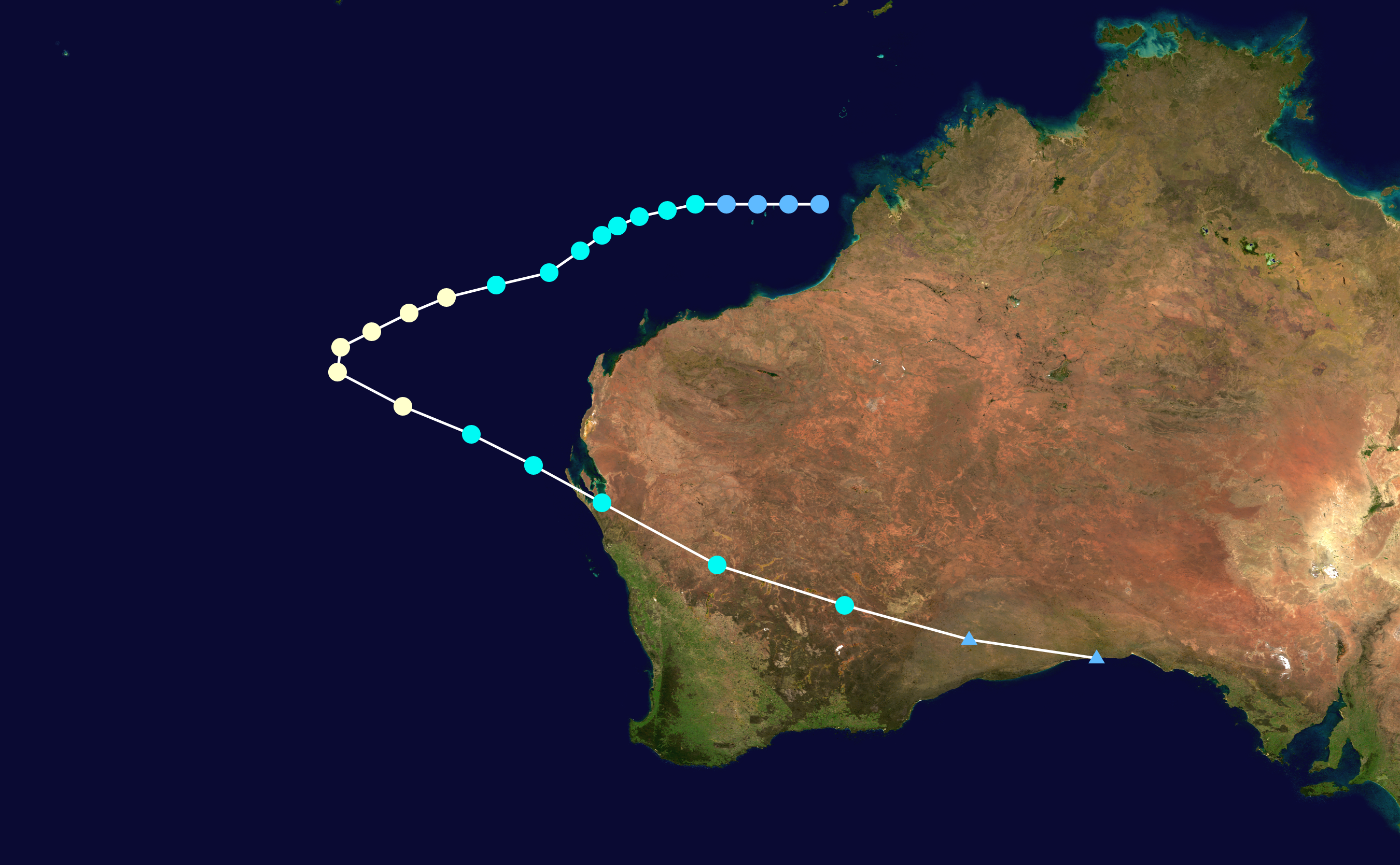
- Duration: March 23 – March 29
- Peak intensity: 120 km/h (75 mph) (10-min); 975 hPa (mbar)

Mavis, 23 to 29 March 1971 crossed coast near Denham, Western Australia causing flooding.

== See also ==
- Atlantic hurricane seasons: 1970, 1971
- Eastern Pacific hurricane seasons: 1970, 1971
- Western Pacific typhoon seasons: 1970, 1971
- North Indian Ocean cyclone seasons: 1970, 1971
