= Hurricane Barbara (1953) =

Category 1 Atlantic hurricane in 1953

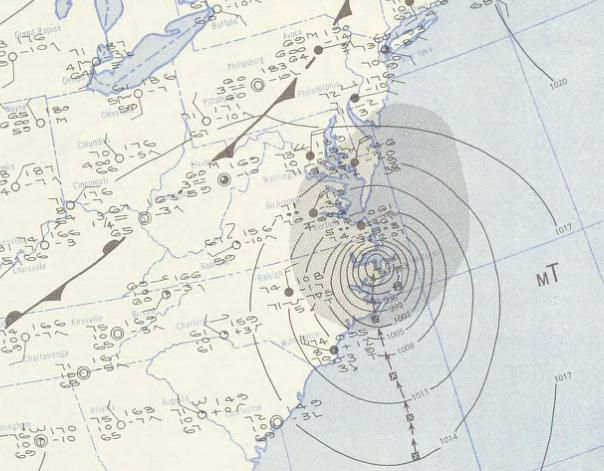
- August 14 weather map featuring Hurricane Barbara

Meteorological history
- Formed: August 11, 1953
- Extratropical: August 15, 1953
- Dissipated: August 16, 1953

Category 1 hurricane
- 1-minute sustained (SSHWS/NWS)
- Highest winds: 90 mph (150 km/h)
- Lowest pressure: 973 mbar (hPa); 28.73 inHg

Overall effects
- Fatalities: 9
- Damage: $1.3 million (1953 USD)
- Areas affected: Eastern United States
- IBTrACS
- Part of the 1953 Atlantic hurricane season

Hurricane Barbara was the second named tropical cyclone of the 1953 Atlantic hurricane season. Forming from a tropical wave on August 11 in the southern Bahamas, Barbara moved northward and attained hurricane status the next day. Ultimately peaking with winds corresponding to a Category 1 hurricane on the modern-day Saffir–Simpson hurricane scale, Barbara moved ashore in eastern North Carolina and curved back out to sea. The storm passed to the southeast of the New England region and dissipated on August 16. Damage from the hurricane was fairly minor, totaling around $1.3 million (1953 USD, $15.3 million 2025 USD). Most of it occurred in North Carolina and Virginia from crop damage. The hurricane left several injuries, some traffic accidents, as well as seven fatalities in the eastern United States; at least two were due to electrocution from downed power lines. Offshore Atlantic Canada, a small boat sunk, killing its crew of two.

== Meteorological history ==
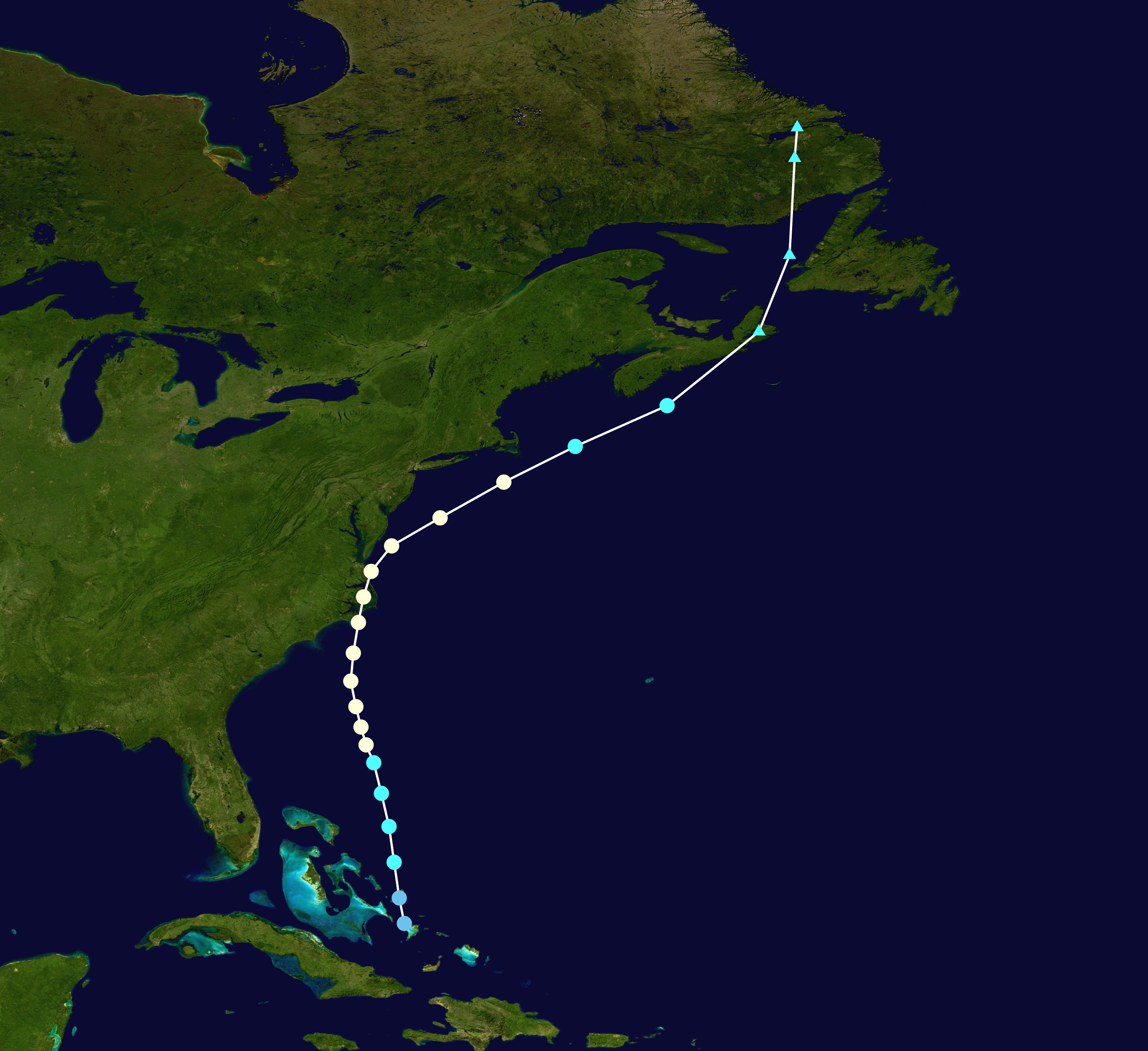
Map plotting the storm's track and intensity, according to the Saffir–Simpson scale Map key Saffir–Simpson scale Tropical depression (≤38 mph, ≤62 km/h) Tropical storm (39–73 mph, 63–118 km/h) Category 1 (74–95 mph, 119–153 km/h) Category 2 (96–110 mph, 154–177 km/h) Category 3 (111–129 mph, 178–208 km/h) Category 4 (130–156 mph, 209–251 km/h) Category 5 (≥157 mph, ≥252 km/h) Unknown Storm type Tropical cyclone Subtropical cyclone Extratropical cyclone, remnant low, tropical disturbance, or monsoon depression

In the days preceding the storm's formation, a tropical wave moved westward across the Atlantic Ocean. The wave was initially weak as it tracked toward Cuba, but on August 10, there were indications of a closed circulation center over the eastern portion of the island. The low deepened a bit as it moved northward to a position near Eleuthera Island in the Bahamas on August 11, at which time the disturbance organized into a tropical storm. The storm intensified throughout the day, and on the morning of August 12, reconnaissance aircraft found winds of about 75 mph (120 km/h) in the northeastern section of the circulation, although the southwestern portion was still weak and disorganized. It is estimated that Barbara became a hurricane at around 1200 UTC.

Moving north-northwestward, the hurricane continued to mature, and it attained an intensity corresponding to a strong Category 1 hurricane on the modern-day Saffir–Simpson hurricane scale early on August 13 as it approached eastern North Carolina. Shortly thereafter, Barbara reached its peak winds of 90 mph (145 km/h) while located south of Cape Hatteras. The cyclone moved over the Outer Banks of North Carolina overnight, crossing the shore between Morehead City and Ocracoke. It weakened as it progressed northward, and curved eastward out to sea due to a building ridge. It passed just southeast of the Mid-Atlantic states and New England, brushing Cape Cod, Massachusetts as it began to accelerate northeastward.

As Barbara moved toward the Canadian Maritimes, it began to undergo an extratropical transition, completing the transition by late on August 15 just south of Nova Scotia. However, the Canadian Hurricane Centre assessed Barbara as remaining tropical until after it turned northward and struck eastern Nova Scotia on August 16. At this time, a trough developed to the southeast of the storm, and Barbara later tracked just west of Newfoundland. A new low formed in association with the trough, and as Barbara rapidly headed northward, the developing center moved more slowly. However, the new low quickly gained strength and became the more intense of the two storm systems. Barbara then stalled near Goose Bay and lost its tropical identity, dissipating late on August 16.

== Preparations and impact ==
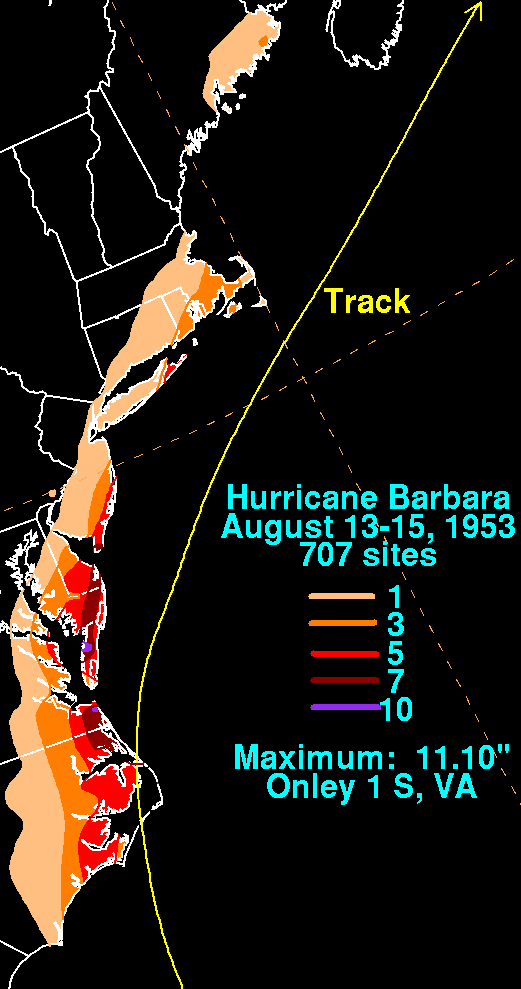
Rainfall summary of Hurricane Barbara

Before the hurricane began affecting land, the U.S. Weather Bureau issued northeast storm warnings from Myrtle Beach, South Carolina to Cape Hatteras, North Carolina. The agency also advised small boats in the region to remain at port during the storm. Evacuations were ordered for a few islands in the Outer Banks, and several thousand tourists voluntarily left the coastline for safer areas. Overall, about 50,000 people evacuated due to the hurricane. Further north, the Coast Guard advised people to avoid swimming along the coast of Long Island.

The lowest pressure on land related to the storm was 988 hPa (29.19 inHg) at Coinjock, North Carolina. Wind gusts of up to 90 mph (140 km/h) were recorded at Hatteras and Nags Head. Torrential rainfall, unofficially exceeding 9 in (230 mm) at Nags Head, fell across the state and extending northward into Virginia. The maximum rainfall associated with Barbara was 11.1 in (280 mm) near Onley along the Eastern Shore of Virginia. Offshore, a freighter rode out the storm after losing power. As the storm passed southeast of New England, winds reached up to 60 mph (97 km/h).

Along the coastline, Barbara flooded roads and houses. Strong winds downed trees and power lines, leaving some cities isolated from communication. Some of the downed trees were large and had survived the Great Atlantic Hurricane of 1944. The combination of winds and rainfall left some damage to crops and structures. The storm's impact along the coast was light to moderate, with monetary damage estimated around $1.3 million (1953 USD, $15.3 million 2025 USD), mostly from the crop damage. Four marines in the Marine Corps Air Station Cherry Point were injured, as was a Coast Guard worker. One person died at Wrightsville Beach, North Carolina, after winds blew him off of a pier. A report on the cyclone by the U.S. Weather Bureau indicates that this is the only causality associated with Barbara. However, newspaper articles subsequent to the storm report several more fatalities, with one paper reporting a total of seven deaths; two of them were from electrocutions. The rainfall from Barbara was blamed for traffic accidents further north in New Jersey and New York City, causing four deaths. There was also an indirect death in New York when a man had a heart attack while securing his boat. In Atlantic City, New Jersey, there was damage to storefronts. Along Nantucket, the hurricane washed several boats ashore, although there was little damage in the region.

In the Grand Banks offshore Atlantic Canada, Barbara sunk a dory, killing two people. Along the Canadian mainland, ships were advised to stay at port during the storm. Barbara produced tropical storm force winds across the region, peaking at 63 mph (101 km/h) when it moved ashore.

== See also ==
- List of North Carolina hurricanes
- List of New England hurricanes
- Other storms of the same name
